= List of short fiction made into feature films =

This is a list of short stories and novellas that have been made into feature films. The title of the work is followed by the work's author, the title of the film, and the year of the film. If a film has an alternate title based on geographical distribution, the title listed will be that of the widest distribution area.

== 0–9 ==
Short fiction	Film adaptation(s)
"12:01 P.M." (1973), Richard A. Lupoff	12:01 PM (1993) (Note: Television film.)
"1408" (1999), Stephen King	1408 (2007)
5135 Kensington (1941–1942) (series) (Note: Later published as a complete novel under the title Meet Me in St. Louis.), Sally Benson	Meet Me in St. Louis (1944)

== A ==
Short fiction	Film adaptation(s)
The Abiding Vision (1935), Rebecca West	A Life of Her Own (1950)
The Acid House (1994), Irvine Welsh	The Acid House (1998)
"Adjustment Team" (1954), Philip K. Dick	The Adjustment Bureau (2011)
"Adultery" (1977) (Note: Conflated with another work from the same author for the film adaptation.), Andre Dubus	We Don't Live Here Anymore (2004)
"The Adventure of Charles Augustus Milverton" (1904), Arthur Conan Doyle	The Missing Rembrandt (1932)
"The Adventure of Silver Blaze" (1892), Arthur Conan Doyle	Silver Blaze (1937)
"The Adventure of Silver Blaze" (1892), Arthur Conan Doyle	Silver Blaze (1977)
"The Adventure of the Blue Carbuncle" (1892), Arthur Conan Doyle	The Blue Carbuncle (Russian: Голубой карбункул) (1980)
"The Adventure of the Dancing Men" (1903), Arthur Conan Doyle	Sherlock Holmes and the Secret Weapon (1943)
"The Adventure of the Empty House" (1903), Arthur Conan Doyle	The Sleeping Cardinal (1931)
"The Adventure of the Empty House" (1903), Arthur Conan Doyle	The Woman in Green (1945)
"The Adventure of the Musgrave Ritual" (1893), Arthur Conan Doyle	Sherlock Holmes Faces Death (1943)
"The Adventure of the Six Napoleons" (1904), Arthur Conan Doyle	The Pearl of Death (1944)
"The Adventure of the Speckled Band" (1892), Arthur Conan Doyle	The Speckled Band (1931)
"The Adventures of Joe Smith, American" (1940), Paul Gallico	Joe Smith, American (1942)
"A-Hunting We Will Go" (1946), D. D. Beauchamp	Father's Wild Game (1950)
"Air Raid" (1977), John Varley	Millennium (1989)
"All You Zombies" (1959), Robert A. Heinlein	Predestination (2014)
"An Altar on Little Thunder" (1912), Elmore Elliott Peake	His Divorcing Wife (1919)
"And So to Death" (1941), Cornell Woolrich (Note: Written as William Irish.)	Fear in the Night (1947)
"And So to Death" (1941), Cornell Woolrich	Nightmare (1956)
Animal Farm (1945), George Orwell	Animal Farm (1954)
Animal Farm (1945), George Orwell	Animal Farm (1999)
Animal Farm (1945), George Orwell	Animal Farm (2025)
An Apartment for Jenny (1947), Faith Baldwin	Apartment for Peggy (1938)
"Appointment with Fear" (1946), Roy Huggins	The Good Humor Man (1950)
Apt Pupil (1982), Stephen King	Apt Pupil (1998)
Armageddon 2419 A.D. (1928), Philip Francis Nowlan	Buck Rogers (1939) (Note: Serial film.)
Armageddon 2419 A.D. (1928), Philip Francis Nowlan	Buck Rogers in the 25th Century (1979)
"Assisting Ananias" (1920), W. C. Tuttle	Fools of Fortune (1922)
"Ate, Memos or the Miracle" (1992), James Lasdun	Sunday (1997)
"August Week-End" (1933), Faith Baldwin	August Weekend (1936)

== B ==
Short fiction	Film adaptation(s)
"B" (1916), Edgar Franklin	The Rail Rider (1916)
"Baa, Baa Black Sheep" (1921), W. C. Tuttle	Black Sheep (1921)
"Babette's Feast (1958), Karen Blixen	Babette's Feast (1987)
"Baby in the Ice-Box" (1933), James M. Cain	She Made Her Bed (1934)
"The Baby's Had a Hard Day" (1940), Anne Wormser	West Point Widow (1941)
"Back Pay" (1919), Fannie Hurst	Back Pay (1922)
"Back Pay" (1919), Fannie Hurst	Back Pay (1930)
"Bad Time at Honda" (1947), Howard Breslin	Bad Day at Black Rock (1955)
"Barn Burning" (1983), Haruki Murakami	Burning (2018)
"The Basement Room" (1936), Graham Greene	The Fallen Idol (1948)
"Basterd", F.W. Remmler	Bastard (1940)
"The Bear Came Over the Mountain" (1999), Alice Munro	Away from Her (2006)
"The Bear Trap" (1919), Byron Morgan	Excuse My Dust (1920)
"Bedside Manner" (1944), Robert Carson	Bedside Manner (1945)
"Beryl and the Croucher" (1916), Thomas Burke	No Way Back (1949)
"Beware of the Dog" (1944), Roald Dahl	36 Hours (1965)
"Beware of the Dog" (1944), Roald Dahl	Breaking Point (1989)
"The Bicentennial Man" (1976), Isaac Asimov	Bicentennial Man (1999)
"The Birds" (1952), Daphne du Maurier	The Birds (1963)
"The Biscuit Eater" (1939), James H. Street	The Biscuit Eater (1940)
"The Biscuit Eater" (1939), James H. Street	The Biscuit Eater (1972)
"The Blackbird" (1928), Robert Musil	Feketerigó (2015)
"The Bleeders" (1919), Margery Land May	The Beauty Market (1919)
"Blow-Up" (Spanish: "Las Babas del Diablo", "The Droolings of the Devil") (1959), Julio Cortázar	Blowup (1966)
The Body (1982), Stephen King	Stand by Me (1986)
"The Body Snatcher" (1881), Robert Louis Stevenson	The Body Snatcher (1945)
"The Boogeyman" (1973), Stephen King	The Boogeyman (2023)
"Boule de Suif" (1880), Guy de Maupassant	Boule de Suif (Russian: Пышка) (1934)
"Boule de Suif" (1880), Guy de Maupassant	The Escape (Spanish: La fuga) (1944)
"Boule de Suif" (1880), Guy de Maupassant	Mademoiselle Fifi (1944)
"Boule de Suif" (1880), Guy de Maupassant	Boule de Suif (1945)
"Bow Tamely to Me" (1936), Kenneth Perkins	Escape to Burma (1955)
"The Boy Cried Murder" (1947), Cornell Woolrich	The Window (1949)
"The Boy Cried Murder" (1947), Cornell Woolrich	The Boy Cried Murder (1966)
"The Branded Sombrero" (1927), Cherry Wilson	The Branded Sombrero (1928)
Breakfast at Tiffany's (1958), Truman Capote	Breakfast at Tiffany's (1961)
"Bring Me His Ears" (1922), Clarence E. Mulford	Borderland (1937)
"Bringing Up Baby" (1937), Hagar Wilde	Bringing Up Baby (1938)
"Broadway Gold" (1922), William Carey Wonderly	Broadway Gold (1923)
"Brokeback Mountain" (1997), Annie Proulx	Brokeback Mountain (2005)
"Brother Orchid" (1938), Richard Connell	Brother Orchid (1940)
"Button, Button" (1970), Richard Matheson	The Box (2009)

== C ==
Short fiction	Film adaptation(s)
Cabal (1988), Clive Barker	Nightbreed (1990)
"Caballero of the Law" (1933), Ben Hecht	Crime Without Passion (1934)
"A Call from Mitch Miller" (1956), Mary Agnes Thompson	Loving You (1957)
"The Call of Cthulhu" (1928), H. P. Lovecraft	The Call of Cthulhu (2005)
"A Call on the President" (1934), Damon Runyon	Joe and Ethel Turp Call on the President (1939)
"The Captives" (1955), Elmore Leonard	The Tall T (1957)
Career in C Major (1938), James M. Cain	Wife, Husband and Friend (1939)
Career in C Major (1938), James M. Cain	Everybody Does It (1949)
The Case of Charles Dexter Ward (1941), H. P. Lovecraft	The Haunted Palace (1963)
The Case of Charles Dexter Ward (1941), H. P. Lovecraft	The Resurrected (1992)
"The Cat from Hell" (1977), Stephen King	Tales from the Darkside: The Movie (1990)
"Chattery Teeth" (1992), Stephen King	Quicksilver Highway (1997)
"Children of the Corn" (1977), Stephen King	Children of the Corn (1984)
"Children of the Corn" (1977), Stephen King	Children of the Corn (2009)
"Children of the Corn" (1977), Stephen King	Children of the Corn (2020)
"Children on Their Birthdays" (1948), Truman Capote	Children on Their Birthdays (2002)
"Ching, Ching, Chinaman" (1917), Wilbur Daniel Steele	Shadows (1922)
"The Chink and the Child" (1928), Thomas Burke	Broken Blossoms (1919)
"The Chink and the Child" (1928), Thomas Burke	Broken Blossoms (1936)
"Christmas '59" (1980), John Hughes	National Lampoon's Christmas Vacation (1989)
A Christmas Carol (1843), Charles Dickens	The Right to Be Happy (1916)
A Christmas Carol (1843), Charles Dickens	Scrooge (1935)
A Christmas Carol (1843), Charles Dickens	A Christmas Carol (1938)
A Christmas Carol (1843), Charles Dickens	A Christmas Carol (Spanish: Leyenda de Navidad) (1947)
A Christmas Carol (1843), Charles Dickens	Scrooge (1951)
A Christmas Carol (1843), Charles Dickens	It's Never Too Late (Italian: Non è mai troppo tardi) (1953)
A Christmas Carol (1843), Charles Dickens	Ein Weihnachtslied in Prosa (1955)
A Christmas Carol (1843), Charles Dickens	Ein Weihnachtslied in Prosa oder Eine Geistergeschichte zum Christfest (1960)
A Christmas Carol (1843), Charles Dickens	A Carol for Another Christmas (1964)
A Christmas Carol (1843), Charles Dickens	Mister Magoo's Christmas Carol (1964)
A Christmas Carol (1843), Charles Dickens	A Christmas Carol (1969)
A Christmas Carol (1843), Charles Dickens	Scrooge (1970)
A Christmas Carol (1843), Charles Dickens	A Christmas Carol (1977)
A Christmas Carol (1843), Charles Dickens	Rich Little's Christmas Carol (1978)
A Christmas Carol (1843), Charles Dickens	Scrooge (1978)
A Christmas Carol (1843), Charles Dickens	The Stingiest Man in Town (1978)
A Christmas Carol (1843), Charles Dickens	An American Christmas Carol (1979)
A Christmas Carol (1843), Charles Dickens	Skinflint: A Country Christmas Carol (1979)
A Christmas Carol (1843), Charles Dickens	A Christmas Carol (1982)
A Christmas Carol (1843), Charles Dickens	Scrooge's Rock 'N' Roll Christmas (1984)
A Christmas Carol (1843), Charles Dickens	A Christmas Carol (1984)
A Christmas Carol (1843), Charles Dickens	John Grin's Christmas (1986)
A Christmas Carol (1843), Charles Dickens	Scrooged (1988)
A Christmas Carol (1843), Charles Dickens	Brer Rabbit's Christmas Carol (1992) (Note: Direct-to-video film.)
A Christmas Carol (1843), Charles Dickens	The Muppet Christmas Carol (1992)
A Christmas Carol (1843), Charles Dickens	A Christmas Carol (1994)
A Christmas Carol (1843), Charles Dickens	A Flintstones Christmas Carol (1994)
A Christmas Carol (1843), Charles Dickens	Ebbie (1995)
A Christmas Carol (1843), Charles Dickens	A Christmas Carol (1997)
A Christmas Carol (1843), Charles Dickens	Ms. Scrooge (1997)
A Christmas Carol (1843), Charles Dickens	The Ghosts of Dickens' Past (1998)
A Christmas Carol (1843), Charles Dickens	An All Dogs Christmas Carol (1998)
A Christmas Carol (1843), Charles Dickens	Ebenezer (1998)
A Christmas Carol (1843), Charles Dickens	A Christmas Carol (1999)
A Christmas Carol (1843), Charles Dickens	A Diva's Christmas Carol (2000)
A Christmas Carol (1843), Charles Dickens	A Christmas Carol (2000)
A Christmas Carol (1843), Charles Dickens	Christmas Carol: The Movie (2001)
A Christmas Carol (1843), Charles Dickens	Scrooge & Marley (2001)
A Christmas Carol (1843), Charles Dickens	A Carol Christmas (2003)
A Christmas Carol (1843), Charles Dickens	A Christmas Carol (2004)
A Christmas Carol (1843), Charles Dickens	Karroll's Christmas (2004)
A Christmas Carol (1843), Charles Dickens	A Christmas Carol (2006)
A Christmas Carol (1843), Charles Dickens	Bah, Humduck! A Looney Tunes Christmas (2006)
A Christmas Carol (1843), Charles Dickens	A Sesame Street Christmas Carol (2006)
A Christmas Carol (1843), Charles Dickens	An American Carol (2008)
A Christmas Carol (1843), Charles Dickens	Barbie in A Christmas Carol (2008)
A Christmas Carol (1843), Charles Dickens	A Christmas Carol (2009)
A Christmas Carol (1843), Charles Dickens	A Christmas Carol (2012)
A Christmas Carol (1843), Charles Dickens	It's Christmas, Carol! (2012)
A Christmas Carol (1843), Charles Dickens	Scrooge & Marley (2012)
A Christmas Carol (1843), Charles Dickens	Mister Scrooge to See You! (2013)
A Christmas Carol (1843), Charles Dickens	A Christmas Carol (2015)
A Christmas Carol (1843), Charles Dickens	A Christmas Carol (2018; directed by Tom Cairns)
A Christmas Carol (1843), Charles Dickens	A Christmas Carol (2018; directed by David Izatt)
A Christmas Carol (1843), Charles Dickens	The Passion of Scrooge (2018)
A Christmas Carol (1843), Charles Dickens	A Christmas Carol (2020)
A Christmas Carol (1843), Charles Dickens	Spirited (2022)
A Christmas Carol (1843), Charles Dickens	Scrooge: A Christmas Carol (2022)
A Christmas Carol (1843), Charles Dickens	Christmas Karma (2025)
A Christmas Carol (1843), Charles Dickens	Ebenezer (2026)
"The Christmas Cross" (1998), Max Lucado	Christmas Child (2003)
"Christmas Eve at Pilot Butte" (1921), Courtney Ryley Cooper	Desperate Trails (1921)
"Come Again Another Day" (1950), Edward Newhouse	Shadow in the Sky (1952)
"Comet Over Broadway" (1937), Faith Baldwin	Comet Over Broadway (1938)
"The Commandos" (1942), C. S. Forester	Commandos Strike at Dawn (1942)
"Cool Air" (1928), H. P. Lovecraft	Cool Air (1999)
"The Corpse Next Door" (1937), Cornell Woolrich	Union City (1980)
"Cottonwood Gulch" (1924), Clarence E. Mulford	North of the Rio Grande (1937)
"Count Pete" (1935), Francis M. Cockrell	Walking on Air (1936)
"Courtin' Calamity" (1917), William Dudley Pelley	The Sawdust Trail (1924)
"Courtin' Calamity" (1917), William Dudley Pelley	Courtin' Wildcats (1929)
"The Coward" (1920), Arthur Stringer	The Coward (1927)
"The Crate" (1979), Stephen King	Creepshow (1982)
"Criminal's Mark" (1950), John Hawkins and Ward Hawkins	Crime Wave (1954)
"Crosstown" (1945), George Zuckerman	99 River Street (1953)
"The Cruise of the Prairie Queen" (1947), D. D. Beauchamp	Leave It to Henry (1949)
"The Curious Case of Benjamin Button" (1922), F. Scott Fitzgerald	The Curious Case of Benjamin Button (2008)
"Cycle of the Werewolf" (1983), Stephen King	Silver Bullet (1985)

== D ==
Short fiction	Film adaptation(s)
"The Dancing Girl" (舞姫, Maihime) (1890), Mori Ōgai	Shishi no Gotoku (1978)
"The Dancing Girl" (舞姫, Maihime) (1890), Mori Ōgai	The Dancer (1989)
"The Dancing Girl of Izu" (伊豆の踊子, Izu no odoriko) (1926), Yasunari Kawabata	The Dancing Girl of Izu (1933)
"The Dancing Girl of Izu" (伊豆の踊子, Izu no odoriko) (1926), Yasunari Kawabata	The Dancing Girl of Izu (1954)
"The Dancing Girl of Izu" (伊豆の踊子, Izu no odoriko) (1926), Yasunari Kawabata	The Dancing Girl of Izu (1960)
"The Dancing Girl of Izu" (伊豆の踊子, Izu no odoriko) (1926), Yasunari Kawabata	The Dancing Girl of Izu (1963)
"The Dancing Girl of Izu" (伊豆の踊子, Izu no odoriko) (1926), Yasunari Kawabata	The Dancing Girl of Izu (1966)
"The Dancing Girl of Izu" (伊豆の踊子, Izu no odoriko) (1926), Yasunari Kawabata	The Dancing Girl of Izu (1974)
"The Dead" (1914), James Joyce	The Dead (1987)
"The Devil and Daniel Webster" (1936), Stephen Vincent Benét	The Devil and Daniel Webster (1941)
"The Devil and Daniel Webster" (1936), Stephen Vincent Benét	Shortcut to Happiness (2003)
"The Devil's Dooryard" (1921), W. C. Tuttle	The Devil's Dooryard (1923)
Discipline and Genevra (1917), Harold Vickers	The Talk of the Town (1918)
"The Djinn in the Nightingale's Eye" (1994), A. S. Byatt	Three Thousand Years of Longing (2022)
"The Dock Walloper", John Monk Saunders	The Docks of New York, 1928
"Don Juan DeMarco and the Centerfold", Jeremy Leven	Don Juan DeMarco (1995)
"Don't Look Now" (1970), Daphne du Maurier	Don't Look Now (1973)
"Doubling for Cupid" (1924), Nina Wilcox Putnam	The Beautiful Cheat (1926)
"The Doubters" (1950), George Tabori	Crisis (1950)
Dream Story (German: Traumnovelle) (1926), Arthur Schnitzler	Dream Story (1969) (TV)
Dream Story (German: Traumnovelle) (1926), Arthur Schnitzler	The Knight, Death and the Devil (Italian: Il cavaliere, la morte e il diavolo) (1989)
Dream Story (German: Traumnovelle) (1926), Arthur Schnitzler	Nightmare in Venice (Italian: Ad un passo dall'aurora) (1989)
Dream Story (German: Traumnovelle) (1926), Arthur Schnitzler	Eyes Wide Shut (1999)
"Drive My Car" (2013), Haruki Murakami	Drive My Car 021)
"The Drover's Wife" (1917), Henry Lawson	The Drover's Wife: The Legend of Molly Johnson (2021)
"The Duel" (1908), Joseph Conrad	The Duellists (1977)
"Duel" (1971), Richard Matheson	Duel (1971)

== E ==
Short fiction	Film adaptation(s)
"Eagle Squadron" (1941), C. S. Forester	Eagle Squadron (1942)
"Eight O'Clock in the Morning" (1963), Ray Nelson	They Live (1988)
"Eisenheim the Illusionist" (1990), Steven Millhauser	The Illusionist (2006)
"Empire of the Ants" (1905), H. G. Wells	Empire of the Ants (1977)
"The Enemy" (1951), Charlotte Armstrong	Talk About a Stranger (1952)
Enemy Mine (1979), Barry B. Longyear	Enemy Mine (1985)
"Enough for Happiness" (1951), D. D. Beauchamp	She Couldn't Say No (1954)
"Escape from Spiderhead" (2010), George Saunders	Spiderhead (2022)

== F ==
Short fiction	Film adaptation(s)
"The Fall of the House of Usher" (1839), Edgar Allan Poe	The Fall of the House of Usher (French: La chute de la maison Usher) (1928)
"The Fall of the House of Usher" (1839), Edgar Allan Poe	The Fall of the House of Usher (1950)
"The Fall of the House of Usher" (1839), Edgar Allan Poe	House of Usher (1960)
"The Fall of the House of Usher" (1839), Edgar Allan Poe	Satan of All Horrors (Spanish: Satanás de todos los horrores) (1974)
"The Fall of the House of Usher" (1839), Edgar Allan Poe	The Fall of the House of Usher (1982) (Note: Produced in 1979, but left unreleased until three years later.)
"The Fall of the House of Usher" (1839), Edgar Allan Poe	Revenge in the House of Usher (1982)
"The Fall of the House of Usher" (1839), Edgar Allan Poe	The House of Usher (1989)
"The Fall of the House of Usher" (1839), Edgar Allan Poe	The Fall of the Louse of Usher (2002)
"The Fall of the House of Usher" (1839), Edgar Allan Poe	Descendant (2003)
"The Fall of the House of Usher" (1839), Edgar Allan Poe	Usher (2004)
"The Fall of the House of Usher" (1839), Edgar Allan Poe	The House of Usher (2006)
"The Fall of the House of Usher" (1839), Edgar Allan Poe	House of Usher (2008)
"The Fall of the House of Usher" (1839), Edgar Allan Poe	Extraordinary Tales (2013)
"The Fall of the House of Usher" (1839), Edgar Allan Poe	Fall of the House of Usher (2014)
"The Fall of the House of Usher" (1839), Edgar Allan Poe	The Fall of Usher (2021)
"The Fall of the House of Usher" (1839), Edgar Allan Poe	The Fall of the House of Usher (2023)
"Far-Off Place" (1974), Laurens van der Post	A Far Off Place (1993)
"Farewell to the Master" (1940), Harry Bates	The Day the Earth Stood Still (1951)
"Farewell to the Master" (1940), Harry Bates	The Day the Earth Stood Still (2008)
"The Fashion Plate" (1932), Harry Collins and Warren B. Duff	Fashions of 1934 (1934)
"Fate of the Wolf" (1925), W. C. Tuttle	Driftin' Sands (1928)
"Fifty-two Weeks for Florette" (1921), Elizabeth Alexander	You Belong to Me (1934)
"The Final Problem" (1893), Arthur Conan Doyle	The Sleeping Cardinal (1931)
"The Five Orange Pips" (1891), Arthur Conan Doyle	The House of Fear (1945)
"Floating Water" (浮遊する水, "Fuyū Suru Mizu") (1996), Koji Suzuki	Dark Water (2002)
"Floating Water" (浮遊する水, "Fuyū Suru Mizu") (1996), Koji Suzuki	Dark Water (2005)
"Flowers for Algernon" (1959), Daniel Keyes	Charly (1968)
"Flowers for Algernon" (1959), Daniel Keyes	Flowers for Algernon (2000)
"Flowers for Algernon" (1959), Daniel Keyes	Flowers for Algernon (French: Des fleurs pour Algernon) (2006)
"Flowers for Algernon" (1959), Daniel Keyes	Flowers for Algernon (2014)
"The Fly" (1957), George Langelaan	The Fly (1958)
"The Fly" (1957), George Langelaan	Return of the Fly (1959)
"The Fly" (1957), George Langelaan	Curse of the Fly (1965)
"The Fly" (1957), George Langelaan	The Fly (1986)
"The Fly" (1957), George Langelaan	The Fly II (1989)
"The Fog Horn" (1952), Ray Bradbury	The Beast from 20,000 Fathoms (1953)
"The Forged Coupon" (Russian: Фальшивый купон, Fal'shivyi kupon) (1911), Leo Tolstoy	L'Argent (1983)
"The Forged Coupon" (Russian: Фальшивый купон, Fal'shivyi kupon) (1911), Leo Tolstoy	Frozen Land (Finnish: Paha maa) (2005)
"For Your Eyes Only" (1960), Ian Fleming	For Your Eyes Only (1981)
"The Fox" (1923), D. H. Lawrence	The Fox (1967)
"From a View to a Kill" (1960), Ian Fleming	A View to a Kill (1985)
"From Beyond" (1934), H. P. Lovecraft	From Beyond (1986)
"Frontier Frenzy" (1954), John Reese	The Young Land (1959)

== G ==
Short fiction	Film adaptation(s)
"Garlan & Co." (1902), David Graham Phillips	Souls for Sables (1925)
"A Gentle Creature" (Russian: Кроткая, Krotkaya; 1876), Fyodor Dostoyevsky	Krotkaya (1962)
"A Gentle Creature" (Russian: Кроткая, Krotkaya; 1876), Fyodor Dostoyevsky	Une femme douce (1969)
"A Gentle Creature" (Russian: Кроткая, Krotkaya; 1876), Fyodor Dostoyevsky	Łagodna (1995)
"A Gentle Creature" (Russian: Кроткая, Krotkaya; 1876), Fyodor Dostoyevsky	Nazar (1989)
"A Gentle Creature" (Russian: Кроткая, Krotkaya; 1876), Fyodor Dostoyevsky	The Shade (1963)
"The Gentleman from Paris" (1950), John Dickson Carr	The Man with a Cloak (1951)
"The Golden Man" (1953), Philip K. Dick	Next (2007)
"Ghost Walker", Ian MacKenzie Jeffers	The Grey (2011)
"The Gift of Cochise" (1952), Louis L'Amour	Hondo (1953)
Gigi (1944), Colette	Gigi (1949)
Gigi (1944), Colette	Gigi (1958)
"Goodbye, Columbus" (1959), Philip Roth	Goodbye, Columbus (1969)
"The Gossamer Web" (1921), John A. Moroso	Luring Lips (1921)
"The Gossamer World" (1948), Faith Baldwin	Queen for a Day (1951)
"The Grandflapper" (1926), Nina Wilcox Putnam	Slaves of Beauty (1927)
"Grave of the Fireflies" (火垂るの墓, Hotaru no Haka) (1967), Akiyuki Nosaka	Grave of the Fireflies (火垂るの墓, Hotaru no Haka) (1988)
"Grave of the Fireflies" (火垂るの墓, Hotaru no Haka) (1967), Akiyuki Nosaka	Grave of the Fireflies (火垂るの墓, Hotaru no Haka) (2005)
"Grave of the Fireflies" (火垂るの墓, Hotaru no Haka) (1967), Akiyuki Nosaka	Grave of the Fireflies (火垂るの墓, Hotaru no Haka) (2008)
"Graveyard Shift" (1970), Stephen King	Graveyard Shift (1990)
"The Greatest Gift" (written 1939; published 1943), Philip Van Doren Stern	It's a Wonderful Life (1946)
"The Greatest Gift" (written 1939; published 1943), Philip Van Doren Stern	It Happened One Christmas (1977)
"The Greatest Gift" (written 1939; published 1943), Philip Van Doren Stern	Clarence (1990)
"Gun Crazy" (1940), MacKinlay Kantor	Gun Crazy (1950)

== H ==
Short fiction	Film adaptation(s)
"Happy Dan, the Cynical Dog" (1945), Ward Greene	Lady and the Tramp (1955)
"Happy Dan, the Cynical Dog" (1945), Ward Greene	Lady and the Tramp II: Scamp's Adventure (2000)
"Happy Dan, the Cynical Dog" (1945), Ward Greene	Lady and the Tramp (2019)
"The Hairless Mexican" (1928), W. Somerset Maugham	Secret Agent (1936)
"Harrison Bergeron" (1961), Kurt Vonnegut Jr.	Between Time and Timbuktu (1972)
"Harrison Bergeron" (1961), Kurt Vonnegut Jr.	Harrison Bergeron (1995)
"He That Is Without Sin" (1916), May Edginton	The Love Auction (1919)
"The Heart is Young" (1930), May Edginton	The False Madonna (1931)
"Heart of Darkness" (serialised 1899, published as a book 1903), Joseph Conrad	Apocalypse Now (1979)
"Heart of Darkness" (serialised 1899, published as a book 1903), Joseph Conrad	Heart of Darkness (1993)
"Heavenly Shades of Night Are Falling" (1999), Stephen King	Hearts in Atlantis (2001)
"Heartbreak" (1940), Leslie Bush-Fekete	Appointment for Love (1941)
"Heaven's Gate" (1934), Florence Leighton Pfalzgraf	Our Little Girl (1935)
"The Hell Diggers" (1920), Byron Morgan	The Hell Diggers (1921)
"The Hellbound Heart" (1986), Clive Barker	Hellraiser (1987)
"Her Night of Nights" (1921), C. S. Montayne	Her Night of Nights (1922)
"High Diver" (1948), John Ashworth	Queen for a Day (1951)
"The Hippopotamus Parade" (1919), Byron Morgan	What's Your Hurry? (1920)
"The Hippopotamus Parade" (1919), Byron Morgan	Man Power (1927)
"The Hopper" (1916), Meredith Nicholson	The Hopper (1918)
"The Horla" (French: "Le Horla") (1887), Guy de Maupassant	Diary of a Madman (1963)
"A Horse for Mrs. Custer" (1955), Glendon Swarthout	7th Cavalry (1956)
"Horsie" (1932), Dorothy Parker	Queen for a Day (1951)

== I ==
Short fiction	Film adaptation(s)
"I Married an Artist" (1936), Avery Strakosch	She Married an Artist (1937)
"Idgah" (1938), Munshi Premchand	5 Rupya (2017)
"Impostor" (1953), Philip K. Dick	Impostor (2001)
"In Another Country" (2001), David Constantine	45 Years (2015)
"In a Grove" (藪の中, Yabu no naka) (1922), Ryūnosuke Akutagawa	Rashomon (1950)
"In Conference" (1933), Vera Caspary	Private Scandal (1934)
"In the Spring" (1918), John A. Moroso	The Hand at the Window (1918)
"The Interruption" (1925), W.W. Jacobs	Footsteps in the Fog (1955)
"Inventing the Abbotts" (1987), Sue Miller	Inventing the Abbotts (1997)
"It Had to Be Murder" (1942), Cornell Woolrich	Rear Window (1954)
"It Had to Be Murder" (1942), Cornell Woolrich	Rear Window (1998)

== J ==
Short fiction	Film adaptation(s)
"Jalsaghar" (1938) (Bengali: জলসাঘর Jalsāghar, lit. 'The Music Room'), Tarasankar Bandyopadhyay	Jalsaghar (Bengali: জলসাঘর Jalsāghar, lit. 'The Music Room') (1958)
"Jan of the Jungle" (1931), Otis Adelbert Kline	The Call of the Savage (1935)
"Johnny Mnemonic" (1981), William Gibson	Johnny Mnemonic (1995)
"Journal of Linnett Moore" (1947), James Edward Grant	The Proud Rebel (1958)
"Journey at Sunrise" (1946), D. D. Beauchamp	Father Makes Good (1950)
"The Joy Girl" (1926), May Edginton	The Joy Girl (1927)
"Judgement" (1924), May Edginton	Her Husband's Secret (1925)
"Junior Miss" (1941), Sally Benson	Junior Miss (1945)
"Junkpile Sweepstakes" (1918), Byron Morgan	The Roaring Road (1919)

== K ==
Short fiction	Film adaptation(s)
"The Killers" (1927), Ernest Hemingway	The Killers (1946)
"The Killers" (1927), Ernest Hemingway	The Killers (1956)
"The Killers" (1927), Ernest Hemingway	The Killers (1964)
"Killings" (1979), Andre Dubus	In the Bedroom (2001)
"Killing a Mouse on Sunday" (1961), Emeric Pressburger	Behold a Pale Horse (1964)

== L ==
Short fiction	Film adaptation(s)
"The Ladder" (1918), Harold Vickers	The Ladder of Lies (1920)
"Ladies in Lavender" (1908) William Locke	Ladies in Lavender (2004)
"A Lady Comes to Burkburnett" (1939), James Edward Grant	Boom Town (1940)
"The Lady with the Dog" (Russian: "Дама с собачкой", Dama s sobachkoy; 1899), Anton Chekhov	The Lady with the Dog (1960)
"The Lady with the Dog" (Russian: "Дама с собачкой", Dama s sobachkoy; 1899), Anton Chekhov	Dark Eyes (1987)
"The Law Rustlers" (1921), W. C. Tuttle	The Law Rustlers (1923)
"The Lawnmower Man" (1975), Stephen King	The Lawnmower Man (1992)
"The Lawnmower Man" (1975), Stephen King	Lawnmower Man 2: Beyond Cyberspace (1996)
"The Ledge" (1976), Stephen King	Cat's Eye (1985)
"The Ledger of Life" (1922), George Pattullo	Private Affairs (1925)
"The Legend of Sleepy Hollow" (1820), Washington Irving (Note: Written as Geoffrey Crayon.)	The Headless Horseman (1922)
"The Legend of Sleepy Hollow" (1820), Washington Irving	The Adventures of Ichabod and Mr. Toad (1949)
"The Legend of Sleepy Hollow" (1820), Washington Irving	The Legend of Sleepy Hollow (1980)
"The Legend of Sleepy Hollow" (1820), Washington Irving	The Legend of Sleepy Hollow (1988)
"The Legend of Sleepy Hollow" (1820), Washington Irving	The Legend of Sleepy Hollow (1999)
"The Legend of Sleepy Hollow" (1820), Washington Irving	Sleepy Hollow (1999)
"The Legend of Sleepy Hollow" (1820), Washington Irving	The Night of the Headless Horseman (1999)
"The Legend of Sleepy Hollow" (1820), Washington Irving	The Haunted Pumpkin of Sleepy Hollow (2003)
"The Legend of Sleepy Hollow" (1820), Washington Irving	The Hollow (2004)
"Leiningen Versus the Ants" (1938), Carl Stephenson	The Naked Jungle (1954)
"Lisbon" (1950), Martin Rackin	Lisbon (1956)
"Little Bear Bongo" (1936), Sinclair Lewis	Fun and Fancy Free (1947)
"The Living Daylights" (1962), Ian Fleming	The Living Daylights (1987)
"The Lodge in the Wilderness" (1909), Gilbert Parker	The Lodge in the Wilderness (1926)
"The Loneliness of the Long Distance Runner" (1959), Alan Sillitoe	The Loneliness of the Long Distance Runner (1962)
"Lot No. 249" (1892), Arthur Conan Doyle	Tales from the Darkside: The Movie (1990)
"The Luck of Roaring Camp" (1868), Bret Harte	The Luck of Roaring Camp (1909)
"The Luck of Roaring Camp" (1868), Bret Harte	The Luck of Roaring Camp (1911)
"The Luck of Roaring Camp" (1868), Bret Harte	Four of the Apocalypse (1975)
"The Lurking Fear" (publ. 1923), H. P. Lovecraft	Dark Heritage (1989)
"The Lurking Fear" (publ. 1923), H. P. Lovecraft	The Lurking Fear (1994)
"The Lurking Fear" (publ. 1923), H. P. Lovecraft	Bleeders (1997)

== M ==
Short fiction	Film adaptation(s)
"Madame la Gimp" (1929), Damon Runyon	Lady for a Day (1933)
"Madame la Gimp" (1929), Damon Runyon	Pocketful of Miracles (1961)
"Madame la Gimp" (1929), Damon Runyon	Miracles (1989)
"Madman's Holiday" (1943), Fredric Brown	Crack-Up (1946)
"A Man Called Horse" (1950), Dorothy M. Johnson	A Man Called Horse (1970)
"A Man Called Horse" (1950), Dorothy M. Johnson	The Return of a Man Called Horse (1976)
"A Man Called Horse" (1950), Dorothy M. Johnson	Triumphs of a Man Called Horse (1983)
"The Man Who Would Be King" (1888), Rudyard Kipling	The Man Who Would Be King (1975)
"The Man Who Could Work Miracles" (1898), H.G. Wells	The Man Who Could Work Miracles (1936)
"A Man Without a Country" (1939), Noel Monkman	The Power and the Glory (1941)
"The Mangler" (1972), Stephen King	The Mangler (1995)
"The Mangler" (1972), Stephen King	The Mangler 2 (2001)
"The Mangler" (1972), Stephen King	The Mangler Reborn (2005)
"Memento Mori" (1996), Jonathan Nolan	Memento (2000)
"The Men She Married" (1916), Harold Vickers	The Men She Married (1916)
"Mimsy Were the Borogoves" (1943), Lewis Padgett	The Last Mimzy (2007)
"The Minority Report" (1956), Philip K. Dick	Minority Report (2002)
"Miss Thompson" (a.k.a. "Rain"; 1951), W. Somerset Maugham	Sadie Thompson (1928)
"Miss Thompson" (a.k.a. "Rain"; 1951), W. Somerset Maugham	Rain (1932)
"Miss Thompson" (a.k.a. "Rain"; 1951), W. Somerset Maugham	Dirty Gertie from Harlem U.S.A.(1946)
"Miss Thompson" (a.k.a. "Rain"; 1951), W. Somerset Maugham	Miss Sadie Thompson (1953)
"Missing Witness" (1954), John and Ward Hawkins	The Shadow on the Window (1957)
"The Mist" (1980), Stephen King	The Mist (2007)
"Malloy Campeador" (1921), Ralph G. Kirk	The Scrapper (1922)
"Monihara" (Bengali: মনিহারা) (1891), Rabindranath Tagore	Teen Kanya (Bengali: তিন কন্যা) (1961)
"Morpho Eugenia" (1992), A. S. Byatt	Angels & Insects (1996)
"The Most Dangerous Game" (1924), Richard Connell	The Most Dangerous Game (1932)
"The Most Dangerous Game" (1924), Richard Connell	A Game of Death (1945)
"The Most Dangerous Game" (1924), Richard Connell	The Dangerous Game (1953)
"The Most Dangerous Game" (1924), Richard Connell	Run for the Sun (1956)
"The Most Dangerous Game" (1924), Richard Connell	Bloodlust! (1961)
"The Most Dangerous Game" (1924), Richard Connell	The Naked Prey (1965)
"The Most Dangerous Game" (1924), Richard Connell	The Woman Hunt (1973)
"The Most Dangerous Game" (1924), Richard Connell	Mottomo kiken na yuugi (1978)
"The Most Dangerous Game" (1924), Richard Connell	Turkey Shoot (1982)
"The Most Dangerous Game" (1924), Richard Connell	Slave Girls from Beyond Infinity (1987)
"The Most Dangerous Game" (1924), Richard Connell	Deadly Prey (1988)
"The Most Dangerous Game" (1924), Richard Connell	Lethal Woman (1988)
"The Most Dangerous Game" (1924), Richard Connell	Death Ring (1992)
"The Most Dangerous Game" (1924), Richard Connell	Hard Target (1993)
"The Most Dangerous Game" (1924), Richard Connell	Surviving the Game (1994)
"The Most Dangerous Game" (1924), Richard Connell	The Pest (1997)
"The Most Dangerous Game" (1924), Richard Connell	The Tournament (2009)
"The Most Dangerous Game" (1924), Richard Connell	Naked Fear (2007)
"The Most Dangerous Game" (1924), Richard Connell	Taxidermy (2011)
"Mr. Billings Spends His Dime" (1920), Dana Burnet	Mr. Billings Spends His Dime (1923)

== N ==
Short fiction	Film adaptation(s)
"New Rose Hotel", William Gibson	New Rose Hotel (1998)
Nick Adams (1924–1933) (series), Ernest Hemingway	Hemingway's Adventures of a Young Man (1962)
"Night Bus" (1933), Samuel Hopkins Adams	It Happened One Night (1934)
"Night Bus" (1933), Samuel Hopkins Adams	You Can't Run Away from It (1956)
"The Night Flier" (1988), Stephen King	The Night Flier (1997)
"The Night of the Iguana" (1948), Tennessee Williams	The Night of the Iguana (1964)
"The Night Runner" (1955), Owen Cameron	The Night Runner (1957)
"Nightmare at 20,000 Feet" (1961), Richard Matheson	Twilight Zone: The Movie (1983)
"No Hard Feelings" (1938), Frederick Nebel	A Shot in the Dark (1941)
"No Law in Shadow Valley" (1936), W. C. Tuttle	Lawless Valley (1938)
"Now You See It" (1946), Roy Huggins	The Fuller Brush Man (1948)
"The Nutcracker and the Mouse King" (German: Nussknacker und Mausekönig) (1816), E. T. A. Hoffmann	Fantasia (1940)
"The Nutcracker and the Mouse King" (German: Nussknacker und Mausekönig) (1816), E. T. A. Hoffmann	The Enchanted Nutcracker (1961)
"The Nutcracker and the Mouse King" (German: Nussknacker und Mausekönig) (1816), E. T. A. Hoffmann	The Nutcracker (1965)
"The Nutcracker and the Mouse King" (German: Nussknacker und Mausekönig) (1816), E. T. A. Hoffmann	The Nutcracker (Russian: Щелкунчик) (1973)
"The Nutcracker and the Mouse King" (German: Nussknacker und Mausekönig) (1816), E. T. A. Hoffmann	Nutcracker Fantasy (1979)
"The Nutcracker and the Mouse King" (German: Nussknacker und Mausekönig) (1816), E. T. A. Hoffmann	Nutcracker: The Motion Picture (1986)
"The Nutcracker and the Mouse King" (German: Nussknacker und Mausekönig) (1816), E. T. A. Hoffmann	Care Bears Nutcracker Suite (1988)
"The Nutcracker and the Mouse King" (German: Nussknacker und Mausekönig) (1816), E. T. A. Hoffmann	The Nutcracker Prince (1990)
"The Nutcracker and the Mouse King" (German: Nussknacker und Mausekönig) (1816), E. T. A. Hoffmann	George Balanchine's The Nutcracker (1993)
"The Nutcracker and the Mouse King" (German: Nussknacker und Mausekönig) (1816), E. T. A. Hoffmann	The Nutcracker (1993)
"The Nutcracker and the Mouse King" (German: Nussknacker und Mausekönig) (1816), E. T. A. Hoffmann	The Nuttiest Nutcracker (1999)
"The Nutcracker and the Mouse King" (German: Nussknacker und Mausekönig) (1816), E. T. A. Hoffmann	Barbie in the Nutcracker (2001)
"The Nutcracker and the Mouse King" (German: Nussknacker und Mausekönig) (1816), E. T. A. Hoffmann	The Nutcracker and the Mouse King (2004)
"The Nutcracker and the Mouse King" (German: Nussknacker und Mausekönig) (1816), E. T. A. Hoffmann	Tom and Jerry: A Nutcracker Tale (2007)
"The Nutcracker and the Mouse King" (German: Nussknacker und Mausekönig) (1816), E. T. A. Hoffmann	The Secret of the Nutcracker (2007)
"The Nutcracker and the Mouse King" (German: Nussknacker und Mausekönig) (1816), E. T. A. Hoffmann	The Nutcracker in 3D (2010)
"The Nutcracker and the Mouse King" (German: Nussknacker und Mausekönig) (1816), E. T. A. Hoffmann	The Nutcracker and the Four Realms (2018)

== O ==
Short fiction	Film adaptation(s)
"Ocean Gold" (1938), Augustus Muir	The Phantom Submarine (1940)
"Octopussy" (1965), Ian Fleming	Octopussy (1983)
"Odd Thursday" (1932), Vera Caspary	Such Women Are Dangerous (1934)
"Old Joy" (2004), Jonathan Raymond	Old Joy (2006)
"Opera Hat" (1935), Clarence Budington Kelland	Mr. Deeds Goes to Town (1936)
"Opera Hat" (1935), Clarence Budington Kelland	Mr. Deeds (2002)
"Out of the Blue" (1947), Vera Caspary	Out of the Blue (1947)
"The Outcasts of Poker Flat" (1869), Bret Harte	The Outcasts of Poker Flat (1919)
"The Outcasts of Poker Flat" (1869), Bret Harte	The Outcasts of Poker Flat (1937)
"The Outcasts of Poker Flat" (1869), Bret Harte	The Outcasts of Poker Flat (1952)
"The Outcasts of Poker Flat" (1869), Bret Harte	Four of the Apocalypse (Italian: I quattro dell'apocalisse) (1975)
"The Outsider" (1926), H. P. Lovecraft	Castle Freak (1995)

== P ==
Short fiction	Film adaptation(s)
"Page Tim O'Brien" (1922), John A. Moroso	Love in the Dark (1922)
"The Palace Thief" (1994), Ethan Canin	The Emperor's Club (2002)
"Paycheck" (1953), Philip K. Dick	Paycheck (2003)
"Peaceful" (1920), W. C. Tuttle	Peaceful Peters (1922)
"Pete's Dragon and the USA (Forever After)", Seton I. Miller and S.S. Field	Pete's Dragon (1977)
"Pete's Dragon and the USA (Forever After)", Seton I. Miller and S.S. Field	Pete's Dragon (2016)
"Poison" (1950), Roald Dahl	The Wonderful Story of Henry Sugar and Three More (2024)
"Portrait of Jennie" (1940), Robert Nathan	Portrait of Jennie (1948)
"The Postmaster" (Bengali: পোস্টমাস্টার (1914), Rabindranath Tagore	Teen Kanya (Bengali: তিন কন্যা) (1961)
"The Prince Who Was a Thief" (1945), Theodore Dreiser	The Prince Who Was a Thief (1951)
"The Princess and the Plumber" (1929), Alice Duer Miller	The Princess and the Plumber (1930)
"The Princess of Montpensier" (1662), Madame de La Fayette	The Princess of Montpensier (2011)
"Private Pettigrew's Girl" (1918), Dana Burnet	Pettigrew's Girl (1919)
"Private Pettigrew's Girl" (1918), Dana Burnet	The Shopworn Angel (1928)
"Private Pettigrew's Girl" (1918), Dana Burnet	The Shopworn Angel (1938)
"Purple and Fine Linen" (1926), May Edginton	Three Hours (1937)
"Purple and Fine Linen" (1926), May Edginton	Adventure in Manhattan (1936)

== Q ==
Short fiction	Film adaptation(s)
"Quintuplets to You" (1936), Olga Moore	You Can't Beat Love (1937)
"Quitters, Inc." (1978), Stephen King	Cat's Eye (1985)
"Quitters, Inc." (1978), Stephen King	No Smoking (2007)

== R ==
Short fiction	Film adaptation(s)
"The Racer" (1956), Ib Melchior	Death Race 2000 (1975)
"The Racer" (1956), Ib Melchior	Death Race (2008)
"The Racer" (1956), Ib Melchior	Death Race 2 (2011) (Note: Prequel to the film.)
"The Racer" (1956), Ib Melchior	Death Race 3: Inferno (2012)
"The Racer" (1956), Ib Melchior	Death Race 2050 (2017)
"The Racer" (1956), Ib Melchior	Death Race: Beyond Anarchy (2018)
"The Raft" (1982), Stephen King	Creepshow 2 (1987)
"The Rainmaker" (1949), D. D. Beauchamp	Henry, the Rainmaker (1949)
"Random Quest" (1961), John Wyndham	Quest for Love (1971)
"Random Quest" (1961), John Wyndham	Random Quest (2006)
"The Rat Catcher" (1953), Roald Dahl	The Wonderful Story of Henry Sugar and Three More (2024)
"The Reformer and the Redhead" (1949), Robert Carson	The Reformer and the Redhead (1950)
"The Return" (written 1897, published 1898), Joseph Conrad	Gabrielle (2005)
"The Riddle of the Dangling Pearl" (1933), Stuart Palmer	The Plot Thickens (1936)
"The Riddle of the Forty Naughty Girls" (1934), Stuart Palmer	Forty Naughty Girls (1937)
"Riding the Bullet" (2000), Stephen King	Riding the Bullet (2004)
"Rita Hayworth and Shawshank Redemption" (1982), Stephen King	The Shawshank Redemption (1994)
"Roaring Road" (1918), Byron Morgan	The Roaring Road (1919)
"Roller Ball Murder" (1973), William Harrison	Rollerball (1975)
"Roller Ball Murder" (1973), William Harrison	Rollerball (2002)
Rope Burns: Stories from the Corner (2000), F.X. Toole	Million Dollar Baby (2004)
"R.S.V.P" (1950), Jerome Weidman	Invitation (1952)
"Ruidoso" (1974), John McPhee	Casey's Shadow (1978)
"Running for Rooney" (1928), Sam Hellman	The Dark Horse (1946)
"Rust and Bone" (2005), Craig Davidson	Rust and Bone (2012)

== S ==
Short fiction	Film adaptation(s)
"Sadie Goes to Heaven" (1917), Dana Burnet	Sadie Goes to Heaven (1917)
"Samapti" (Bengali: সমাপ্তি) (1893), Rabindranath Tagore	Teen Kanya (Bengali: তিন কন্যা) (1961)
"Sansho the Bailiff" (Japanese: 山椒大夫, romanized: Sanshō Dayū) (1915), Mori Ōgai	Sansho the Bailiff (Japanese: 山椒大夫, romanized: Sanshō Dayū) (1954)
"Sardonicus" (1961), Ray Russell	Mr. Sardonicus (1961)
"Second Chance" (1948), Faith Baldwin	Second Chance (1950)
"Second Variety" (1953), Philip K. Dick	Screamers (1995)
"Second Variety" (1953), Philip K. Dick	Screamers: The Hunting (2009)
"Secretary" (1989), Mary Gaitskill	Secretary (2002)
"The Secret Life of Walter Mitty" (1939), James Thurber	The Secret Life of Walter Mitty (1947)
"The Secret Life of Walter Mitty" (1939), James Thurber	The Secret Life of Walter Mitty (2013)
"Secret Window, Secret Garden" (1990), Stephen King	Secret Window (2004)
"Secrets" (1918), May Edginton	Secrets (1924)
"Secrets" (1918), May Edginton	Secrets (1933)
"See How They Run" (1951), Mary Elizabeth Vroman	Bright Road (1953)
"The Seed and the Sower" (1963), Laurens van der Post	Merry Christmas, Mr. Lawrence (1983)
"The Self-Made Wife" (1922), Elizabeth Alexander	The Self-Made Wife (1923)
"The Sentinel" (a.k.a. "Sentinel of Eternity") (1951), Arthur C. Clarke	2001: A Space Odyssey (1968)
"The Shadow Over Innsmouth" (1936), H. P. Lovecraft	Lemora (1973)
"The Shadow Over Innsmouth" (1936), H. P. Lovecraft	Dagon (2001)
"The Shadow Over Innsmouth" (1936), H. P. Lovecraft	Cthulhu (2007)
"Shadow Ranch" (1925), George M. Johnson	Shadow Ranch (1930)
"Shadrach" (1979), William Styron	Shadrach (1998)
"Shatranj ke Khiladi", Munshi Premchand	The Chess Players (1977)
"She Goes to War" (1929), Rupert Hughes	She Goes to War (1929)
"She of the Triple Chevron" (1892), Gilbert Parker	Heart of the Wilds (1918)
"She of the Triple Chevron" (1892), Gilbert Parker	Over the Border (1922)
"The Sheriff of Sun-Dog" (1921), W. C. Tuttle	The Sheriff of Sun-Dog (1922)
"The Shoes That Danced" (1917), John A. Moroso	The Shoes That Danced (1918)
"Shopgirl" (2000), Steve Martin	Shopgirl (2005)
"The Short Happy Life of Francis Macomber" (1936), Ernest Hemingway	The Macomber Affair (1947)
"The Silver Mask" (1932), Hugh Walpole	Kind Lady (1935)
"The Silver Mask" (1932), Hugh Walpole	Kind Lady (1951)
"A Situation of Gravity" (1957), Samuel W. Taylor	The Absent-Minded Professor (1961)
"A Situation of Gravity" (1957), Samuel W. Taylor	Son of Flubber (1963)
"A Situation of Gravity" (1957), Samuel W. Taylor	The Absent-Minded Professor (1988)
"A Situation of Gravity" (1957), Samuel W. Taylor	The Absent-Minded Professor: Trading Places (1989)
"A Situation of Gravity" (1957), Samuel W. Taylor	Flubber (1997)
"Sir Piegan Passes" (1923), W. C. Tuttle	The Cheyenne Kid (1933)
"Sleep All Winter" (1949), Richard Wormser and Dan Gordon	The Sundown (1950)
Snowdust (1926), Howard E. Morgan	Mystery Valley (1928)
"The Snows of Kilimanjaro" (1936), Ernest Hemingway	The Snows of Kilimanjaro (1952)
"The Snows of Kilimanjaro" (1936), Ernest Hemingway	The Snows of Kilimanjaro (2011)
"The Sobbin' Women" (1938), Stephen Vincent Benét	Seven Brides for Seven Brothers (1954)
"Sometimes They Come Back" (1974), Stephen King	Sometimes They Come Back (1991)
"Sometimes They Come Back" (1974), Stephen King	Sometimes They Come Back... Again (1996)
"Sometimes They Come Back" (1974), Stephen King	Sometimes They Come Back... for More (1998)
"Spawn of the Desert" (1922), W. C. Tuttle	Spawn of the Desert (1923)
"Spinster Dinner" (1934), Faith Baldwin	Love Before Breakfast (1936)
"Spurs" (1923), Tod Robbins	Freaks (1932)
"St. Dragon and the George" (1957), Gordon R. Dickson	The Flight of Dragons (1982)
"Starr of the Southwest" (1936), Cherry Wilson	Sandflow (1937)
"The Statement of Randolph Carter" (1920), H. P. Lovecraft	The Unnamable II: The Statement of Randolph Carter (1993)
"The Statement of Randolph Carter" (1920), H. P. Lovecraft	13:de mars, 1941 (2004)
"The Statement of Randolph Carter" (1920), H. P. Lovecraft	Kammaren (2007)
"The Statement of Randolph Carter" (1920), H. P. Lovecraft	The Testimony of Randolph Carter (2009)
"The Star" (Russian: Звезда, romanized: Zvezda) (1947), Emmanuil G. Kazakevich	The Star (1949)
"The Star" (Russian: Звезда, romanized: Zvezda) (1947), Emmanuil G. Kazakevich	The Star (2002)
"Steel" (1956), Richard Matheson	Real Steel (2011)
"The Story of an Hour" (1894), Kate Chopin	The Joy That Kills (1984)
"Story of Your Life" (1998), Ted Chiang	Arrival (2016)
"A Story Like the Wind" (1972), Laurens van der Post	A Far Off Place (1993)
"Straight Shooting" (1924), W. C. Tuttle	The Border Sheriff (1926)
"Strange Case of Dr Jekyll and Mr Hyde" (1886), Robert Louis Stevenson	Dr. Jekyll and Mr. Hyde (1920)
"Strange Case of Dr Jekyll and Mr Hyde" (1886), Robert Louis Stevenson	The Head of Janus (German: Der Januskopf) (1920)
"Strange Case of Dr Jekyll and Mr Hyde" (1886), Robert Louis Stevenson	Dr. Jekyll and Mr. Hyde (1931)
"Strange Case of Dr Jekyll and Mr Hyde" (1886), Robert Louis Stevenson	Dr. Jekyll and Mr. Hyde (1941)
"Strange Case of Dr Jekyll and Mr Hyde" (1886), Robert Louis Stevenson	The Son of Dr. Jekyll (1951)
"Strange Case of Dr Jekyll and Mr Hyde" (1886), Robert Louis Stevenson	Abbott and Costello Meet Dr. Jekyll and Mr. Hyde (1953)
"Strange Case of Dr Jekyll and Mr Hyde" (1886), Robert Louis Stevenson	The Daughter of Dr. Jekyll (1957)
"Strange Case of Dr Jekyll and Mr Hyde" (1886), Robert Louis Stevenson	The Doctor's Horrible Experiment (French: Le Testament du docteur Cordelier) (1959)
"Strange Case of Dr Jekyll and Mr Hyde" (1886), Robert Louis Stevenson	The Ugly Duckling (1959)
"Strange Case of Dr Jekyll and Mr Hyde" (1886), Robert Louis Stevenson	The Two Faces of Dr. Jekyll (1960)
"Strange Case of Dr Jekyll and Mr Hyde" (1886), Robert Louis Stevenson	Karutha Rathrikal (Malayalam: കറുത്ത രാത്രികൾ) (1967)
"Strange Case of Dr Jekyll and Mr Hyde" (1886), Robert Louis Stevenson	The Strange Case of Dr. Jekyll and Mr. Hyde (1968)
"Strange Case of Dr Jekyll and Mr Hyde" (1886), Robert Louis Stevenson	Dr. Jekyll and Sister Hyde (1971)
"Strange Case of Dr Jekyll and Mr Hyde" (1886), Robert Louis Stevenson	I, Monster (1971)
"Strange Case of Dr Jekyll and Mr Hyde" (1886), Robert Louis Stevenson	Dr. Jekyll y el Hombre Lobo (1972)
"Strange Case of Dr Jekyll and Mr Hyde" (1886), Robert Louis Stevenson	Dr. Jekyll and Mr. Hyde (1973)
"Strange Case of Dr Jekyll and Mr Hyde" (1886), Robert Louis Stevenson	Dr. Black, Mr. Hyde (1976)
"Strange Case of Dr Jekyll and Mr Hyde" (1886), Robert Louis Stevenson	Dr. Jekyll Likes Them Hot (Italian: Dottor Jekyll e gentile signora) (1979)
"Strange Case of Dr Jekyll and Mr Hyde" (1886), Robert Louis Stevenson	Dr. Jekyll and Mr. Hyde (1980)
"Strange Case of Dr Jekyll and Mr Hyde" (1886), Robert Louis Stevenson	Chehre Pe Chehra (Hindi: चेहरे पे चेहरा) (1981)
"Strange Case of Dr Jekyll and Mr Hyde" (1886), Robert Louis Stevenson	The Strange Case of Dr. Jekyll and Mr. Hyde (1981)
"Strange Case of Dr Jekyll and Mr Hyde" (1886), Robert Louis Stevenson	Docteur Jekyll et les femmes (1981)
"Strange Case of Dr Jekyll and Mr Hyde" (1886), Robert Louis Stevenson	Jekyll and Hyde... Together Again (1982)
"Strange Case of Dr Jekyll and Mr Hyde" (1886), Robert Louis Stevenson	The Strange Case of Dr. Jekyll and Mr. Hyde (1985)
"Strange Case of Dr Jekyll and Mr Hyde" (1886), Robert Louis Stevenson	Dr. Jekyll and Mr. Hyde (1986)
"Strange Case of Dr Jekyll and Mr Hyde" (1886), Robert Louis Stevenson	Edge of Sanity (1989)
"Strange Case of Dr Jekyll and Mr Hyde" (1886), Robert Louis Stevenson	Dr. Jekyll and Mr. Hyde (1989)
"Strange Case of Dr Jekyll and Mr Hyde" (1886), Robert Louis Stevenson	Jekyll & Hyde (1990)
"Strange Case of Dr Jekyll and Mr Hyde" (1886), Robert Louis Stevenson	Dr. Jekyll and Ms. Hyde (1995)
"Strange Case of Dr Jekyll and Mr Hyde" (1886), Robert Louis Stevenson	Mary Reilly (1996)
"Strange Case of Dr Jekyll and Mr Hyde" (1886), Robert Louis Stevenson	Dr. Jekyll & Mr. Hyde (1999)
"Strange Case of Dr Jekyll and Mr Hyde" (1886), Robert Louis Stevenson	Dr. Jekyll and Mr. Hyde (2000)
"Strange Case of Dr Jekyll and Mr Hyde" (1886), Robert Louis Stevenson	Dr Jekyll and Mr Hyde (2002)
"Strange Case of Dr Jekyll and Mr Hyde" (1886), Robert Louis Stevenson	The Strange Case of Dr. Jekyll and Mr. Hyde (2006)
"Strange Case of Dr Jekyll and Mr Hyde" (1886), Robert Louis Stevenson	Jekyll + Hyde (2006)
"Strange Case of Dr Jekyll and Mr Hyde" (1886), Robert Louis Stevenson	Jekyll (2007)
"Strange Case of Dr Jekyll and Mr Hyde" (1886), Robert Louis Stevenson	Dr. Jekyll & Mr. Hyde (2008)
"Strange Case of Dr Jekyll and Mr Hyde" (1886), Robert Louis Stevenson	Dr. Jekyll and Mr. Hyde (2017)
"Strange Case of Dr Jekyll and Mr Hyde" (1886), Robert Louis Stevenson	Madame Hyde (2017)
"Strange Case of Dr Jekyll and Mr Hyde" (1886), Robert Louis Stevenson	Jekyll and Hyde (2021)
"Strange Case of Dr Jekyll and Mr Hyde" (1886), Robert Louis Stevenson	Doctor Jekyll (2023)
"Suburbs" (1930), Vera Caspary	Scandal Street (1938)
"The Summons" (1914), George Pattullo	The First Degree (1923)
"Sun-Dog Trails" (1921), W. C. Tuttle	Sun Dog Trails (1923)
"Super-Toys Last All Summer Long" (1969), Brian Aldiss	A.I. Artificial Intelligence (2001)
"The Swan" (1977), Roald Dahl	The Wonderful Story of Henry Sugar and Three More (2024)
"The Swimmer" (1964), John Cheever	The Swimmer (1968)

== T ==
Short fiction	Film adaptation(s)
"Tales of the South Pacific" (1947), James A. Michener	South Pacific (1958)
"Tales of the South Pacific" (1947), James A. Michener	South Pacific (2001)
"Takekurabe" (たけくらべ) (1895–96), Ichiyō Higuchi	Takekurabe (1924)
"Takekurabe" (たけくらべ) (1895–96), Ichiyō Higuchi	Takekurabe (1955)
"Technic" (1925), Dana Burnet	The Marriage Clause (1926)
"There Shall Be No Darkness" (1950), James Blish	The Beast Must Die (1974)
"Third Girl from the Right" (1949), Robert Carson	Ain't Misbehavin' (1951)
The Third Man (1948), Graham Greene	The Third Man (1949)
"Those High Society Blues" (1925), Dana Burnet	High Society Blues (1930)
"The Thought Monster" (1930), Amelia Reynolds Long	Fiend Without a Face (1958)
"Tonī Takitani" (1990), Haruki Murakami	Tony Takitani (2004)
"Too Far to Go" (1979), John Updike	Too Far to Go (1979)
"Too Much Speed" (1921), Byron Morgan	Too Much Speed (1921)
"Toomai of the Elephants" (1894), Rudyard Kipling	Elephant Boy (1937)
"Train Choir" (2008), Jonathan Raymond	Wendy and Lucy (2008)
"The Traitor" (1928), W. Somerset Maugham	Secret Agent (1936)
"Trucks" (1973), Stephen King	Maximum Overdrive (1986)
"Trucks" (1973), Stephen King	Trucks (1997)
"The Turn of the Screw" (1898), Henry James	Matinee Theater (1957)
"The Turn of the Screw" (1898), Henry James	The Turn of the Screw (1959/I; TV)
"The Turn of the Screw" (1898), Henry James	The Turn of the Screw (1959/II; TV)
"The Turn of the Screw" (1898), Henry James	The Innocents (1961)
"The Turn of the Screw" (1898), Henry James	Die sündigen Engel (1962)
"The Turn of the Screw" (1898), Henry James	The Nightcomers (1971) (Note: Prequel to the 1961 film.)
"The Turn of the Screw" (1898), Henry James	Le tour d'écrou (1974)
"The Turn of the Screw" (1898), Henry James	The Turn of the Screw (1974)
"The Turn of the Screw" (1898), Henry James	The Turn of the Screw (1982)
"The Turn of the Screw" (1898), Henry James	Otra vuelta de tuerca (1985)
"The Turn of the Screw" (1898), Henry James	Nightmare Classics: The Turn of the Screw (1989; TV)
"The Turn of the Screw" (1898), Henry James	The Turn of the Screw - Die Drehung der Schraube (1990; TV)
"The Turn of the Screw" (1898), Henry James	The Turn of the Screw (1992)
"The Turn of the Screw" (1898), Henry James	The Turn of the Screw (1994)
"The Turn of the Screw" (1898), Henry James	The Haunting of Helen Walker (a.k.a. The Turn of the Screw) (1995)
"The Turn of the Screw" (1898), Henry James	Presence of Mind (1999)
"The Turn of the Screw" (1898), Henry James	The Turn of the Screw (1999)
"The Turn of the Screw" (1898), Henry James	Le tour d'écrou (2001)
"The Turn of the Screw" (1898), Henry James	The Others (Spanish: Los otros) (2001)
"The Turn of the Screw" (1898), Henry James	The Turn of the Screw (2003)
"The Turn of the Screw" (1898), Henry James	In a Dark Place (2006)
"The Turn of the Screw" (1898), Henry James	The Turn of the Screw (2009)
"The Turn of the Screw" (1898), Henry James	The Turn of the Screw 3D (2013)
"Twenty Minutes" (1988), James Salter	Boys (1992)
"Two Bad Hats" (1937), Monckton Hoffe	The Lady Eve (1941)
"Two Bad Hats" (1937), Monckton Hoffe	The Birds and the Bees (1956)
"Two Can Play" (1922), Gerald Mygatt	Two Can Play (1926)
"Two Weeks with Pay" (1920), Nina Wilcox Putnam	Two Weeks with Pay (1921)

== U ==
Short fiction	Film adaptation(s)
"The Undefeated" (1996), Irvine Welsh	Ecstasy (2009)
"United States Flavor" (1924), Ralph G. Kirk	Men of Steel (1926)
"Undertaker's Handicap" (1918), Byron Morgan	The Roaring Road (1919)
"The Unnamable" (1925), H. P. Lovecraft	The Unnamable (1988)
"Up at the Villa" (1941), W. Somerset Maugham	Up at the Villa (2000)

== V ==
Short fiction	Film adaptation(s)
"Vacation '58" (1979), John Hughes	National Lampoon's Vacation (1983)
"The Vessel of Wrath" (1931), W. Somerset Maugham	Vessel of Wrath (1938)
"The Vessel of Wrath" (1931), W. Somerset Maugham	The Beachcomber (1954)
"The Vessel of Wrath" (1931), W. Somerset Maugham	The Vessel of Wrath (1970)
"The Vessel of Wrath" (1931), W. Somerset Maugham	Wilson's Reward (1980)
"Vigil in the Night" (1939), A. J. Cronin	Vigil in the Night (1940)
"The Virgin and the Gypsy" (written 1926, published 1930), D. H. Lawrence	The Virgin and the Gypsy (1970)

== W ==
Short fiction	Film adaptation(s)
"Wandering Daughters" (1922), Dana Burnet	Wandering Daughters (1923)
"The Wax Works" (1930), Charles Spencer Belden	Mystery of the Wax Museum (1933)
"The Wax Works" (1930), Charles Spencer Belden	House of Wax (1953)
"The Wax Works" (1930), Charles Spencer Belden	House of Wax (2005)
"We Can Remember It for You Wholesale" (1966), Philip K. Dick	Total Recall (1990)
"We Can Remember It for You Wholesale" (1966), Philip K. Dick	Total Recall (2012)
"We Don't Live Here Anymore" (1975), Andre Dubus	We Don't Live Here Anymore (2004)
"Weeds" (1976), Stephen King	Creepshow (1982)
"Where Are You Going, Where Have You Been?" (1966), Joyce Carol Oates	Smooth Talk (1985)
"The Whipsaw" (1934), James Edward Grant	Whipsaw (1935)
"White Nights" (Russian: Белые ночи, romanized: Belye nochi) (1848), Fyodor Dostoyevsky	White Nights (Italian: Le notti bianche, French: Nuits blanches) (1957)
"White Nights" (Russian: Белые ночи, romanized: Belye nochi) (1848), Fyodor Dostoyevsky	White Nights (1959)
"White Nights" (Russian: Белые ночи, romanized: Belye nochi) (1848), Fyodor Dostoyevsky	Chhalia (1960)
"White Nights" (Russian: Белые ночи, romanized: Belye nochi) (1848), Fyodor Dostoyevsky	Four Nights of a Dreamer (French: Quatre nuits d'un rêveur) (1971)
"White Nights" (Russian: Белые ночи, romanized: Belye nochi) (1848), Fyodor Dostoyevsky	White Nights (1992)
"White Nights" (Russian: Белые ночи, romanized: Belye nochi) (1848), Fyodor Dostoyevsky	White Nights (Persian: شب‌های روشن) (2003)
"White Nights" (Russian: Белые ночи, romanized: Belye nochi) (1848), Fyodor Dostoyevsky	Iyarkai (2003)
"White Nights" (Russian: Белые ночи, romanized: Belye nochi) (1848), Fyodor Dostoyevsky	White Nights (2005)
"White Nights" (Russian: Белые ночи, romanized: Belye nochi) (1848), Fyodor Dostoyevsky	Ahista Ahista (2006)
"White Nights" (Russian: Белые ночи, romanized: Belye nochi) (1848), Fyodor Dostoyevsky	Saawariya (2007)
"White Nights" (Russian: Белые ночи, romanized: Belye nochi) (1848), Fyodor Dostoyevsky	Two Lovers (2009)
"White Nights" (Russian: Белые ночи, romanized: Belye nochi) (1848), Fyodor Dostoyevsky	White Nights on the Pier (French: Nuits blanches sur la jetée) (2014)
"White Nights" (Russian: Белые ночи, romanized: Belye nochi) (1848), Fyodor Dostoyevsky	White Nights (Malayalam: വെളുത്ത രാത്രികൾ, Velutha Rathrikal) (2015)
"Who Am I This Time?" (1961), Kurt Vonnegut	Who Am I This Time? (1982)
"Who Goes There?" (1938), John W. Campbell, Jr.	The Thing from Another World (1951)
"Who Goes There?" (1938), John W. Campbell, Jr.	The Thing (1982)
"Who Goes There?" (1938), John W. Campbell, Jr.	The Thing (2011) (Note: Prequel to the 1982 film.)
"Wife Versus Secretary" (1935), Faith Baldwin	Wife vs. Secretary (1936)
"Wine" (1922), William Briggs MacHarg	Wine (1924)
"The Wisdom of Eve" (1946), Mary Orr	All About Eve (1950)
"The Wistful Widow of Wagon Gap" (1947), William Bowers and D. D. Beauchamp	The Wistful Widow of Wagon Gap (1947)
"With Neatness and Dispatch" (1918), Kenneth L. Roberts	With Neatness and Dispatch (1918)
"The Wonderful Race at Rimrock" (1946), D. D. Beauchamp	Feudin', Fussin' and A-Fightin' (1948)
"The Wonderful Story of Henry Sugar" (1977), Roald Dahl	The Wonderful Story of Henry Sugar and Three More (2024)
"World Without End" (1925), May Edginton	His Supreme Moment (1925)

== X ==
Short fiction	Film adaptation(s)
"Xianü" (traditional Chinese: 俠女; simplified Chinese: 侠女; pinyin: Xiá Nǚ; lit. 'Heroic Woman') (1740), Pu Songling	A Touch of Zen (1970-1971)

== Y ==
Short fiction	Film adaptation(s)
"The Yellow Seal" (1925), W. C. Tuttle	The Prairie Pirate (1925)
"Your Arkansas Traveler" (1955), Budd Schulberg	A Face in the Crowd (1957)
"Youth Without Youth" (Romanian: "Tinereţe fără tinereţe") (1976), Mircea Eliade	Youth Without Youth (2007)

== Z ==
Short fiction	Film adaptation(s)
Zorro (1919–1959) (series), Johnston McCulley	The Mark of Zorro (1920)
Zorro (1919–1959) (series), Johnston McCulley	Don Q, Son of Zorro (1925)
Zorro (1919–1959) (series), Johnston McCulley	In the Way of Zorro (French: À la manière de Zorro, Dutch: Op Zorro wize) (1926)
Zorro (1919–1959) (series), Johnston McCulley	The Bold Caballero (1936)
Zorro (1919–1959) (series), Johnston McCulley	Zorro Rides Again (1937)
Zorro (1919–1959) (series), Johnston McCulley	The Mark of Zorro (1940)
Zorro (1919–1959) (series), Johnston McCulley	Zorro's Fighting Legion (1939)
Zorro (1919–1959) (series), Johnston McCulley	Zorro's Black Whip (1944)
Zorro (1919–1959) (series), Johnston McCulley	Son of Zorro (1947)
Zorro (1919–1959) (series), Johnston McCulley	The Grandson of Zorro (Spanish: El nieto del zorro) (1948)
Zorro (1919–1959) (series), Johnston McCulley	Ghost of Zorro (1949)
Zorro (1919–1959) (series), Johnston McCulley	The Dream of Zorro (Italian: Il sogno di Zorro) (1952)
Zorro (1919–1959) (series), Johnston McCulley	Lawless Mountain (Spanish: La montaña sin ley) (1953)
Zorro (1919–1959) (series), Johnston McCulley	The Sign of Zorro (1957)
Zorro (1919–1959) (series), Johnston McCulley	El Jinete solitario (1958)
Zorro (1919–1959) (series), Johnston McCulley	El jinete solitario en el valle de los buitres (1958)
Zorro (1919–1959) (series), Johnston McCulley	El Zorro escarlata en la venganza del ahorcado (1958)
Zorro (1919–1959) (series), Johnston McCulley	The Return of the Monster (Spanish: El regreso del monstruo) (1959)
Zorro (1919–1959) (series), Johnston McCulley	El Zorro escarlata en diligencia fantasma (1959)
Zorro (1919–1959) (series), Johnston McCulley	Zorro, the Avenger (1959)
Zorro (1919–1959) (series), Johnston McCulley	Zorro: El Bandido (1960)
Zorro (1919–1959) (series), Johnston McCulley	Zorro: Adios El Cuchillo (1960)
Zorro (1919–1959) (series), Johnston McCulley	Zorro in the Valley of Ghosts (Spanish: El jinete solitario en el valle de los desaparecidos) (1960)
Zorro (1919–1959) (series), Johnston McCulley	Northern Courier (Spanish: El correo del norte) (1960)
Zorro (1919–1959) (series), Johnston McCulley	Zorro: The Postponed Wedding (1961)
Zorro (1919–1959) (series), Johnston McCulley	Zorro: Auld Acquaintance (1961)
Zorro (1919–1959) (series), Johnston McCulley	La máscara de la muerte (1961)
Zorro (1919–1959) (series), Johnston McCulley	La trampa mortal (1962)
Zorro (1919–1959) (series), Johnston McCulley	La venganza de la Sombra (1962)
Zorro (1919–1959) (series), Johnston McCulley	El Zorro Vengador (1962)
Zorro (1919–1959) (series), Johnston McCulley	Zorro at the Spanish Court (Italian: Zorro alla corte di Spagna) (1962)
Zorro (1919–1959) (series), Johnston McCulley	Zorro the Avenger (Spanish: La venganza del Zorro, Italian: Zorro il vendicatore) (1962)
Zorro (1919–1959) (series), Johnston McCulley	The Shadow of Zorro (Spanish: Cabalgando hacia la muerte; Italian: L'ombra di Zorro) (1962)
Zorro (1919–1959) (series), Johnston McCulley	The Three Swords of Zorro (Italian: Le tre spade di Zorro) (1963)
Zorro (1919–1959) (series), Johnston McCulley	Zorro and the Three Musketeers (Italian: Zorro e i tre moschettieri) (1963)
Zorro (1919–1959) (series), Johnston McCulley	The Invincible Masked Rider (Italian: L'invincibile cavaliere mascherato) (1963)
Zorro (1919–1959) (series), Johnston McCulley	Samson and the Slave Queen (Italian: Zorro contro Maciste) (1963)
Zorro (1919–1959) (series), Johnston McCulley	Duel at the Rio Grande (1963)
Zorro (1919–1959) (series), Johnston McCulley	The Daughters of Zorro (Spanish: Las hijas del Zorro) (1964)
Zorro (1919–1959) (series), Johnston McCulley	The Invincibles (Spanish: Las invencibles) (1964)
Zorro (1919–1959) (series), Johnston McCulley	Behind the Mask of Zorro (Spanish: E Zorro cabalga otra vez, Italian: Il Giuramento di Zorro) (1965)
Zorro (1919–1959) (series), Johnston McCulley	Zorro the Rebel (Italian: Zorro il ribelle) (1966)
Zorro (1919–1959) (series), Johnston McCulley	Zorro the Fox (Spanish: El Zorro, Italian: La Volpe) (1968)
Zorro (1919–1959) (series), Johnston McCulley	The Nephews of Zorro (Italian: I nipoti di Zorro) (1968)
Zorro (1919–1959) (series), Johnston McCulley	Zorro, the Navarra Marquis (Italian: Zorro marchese di Navarra) (1969)
Zorro (1919–1959) (series), Johnston McCulley	Zorro in the Court of England (Italian: Zorro alla corte d'Inghilterra) (1969)
Zorro (1919–1959) (series), Johnston McCulley	Zorro's Latest Adventure (Spanish: La última aventura del Zorro, Italian: Zorro il dominatore) (1969)
Zorro (1919–1959) (series), Johnston McCulley	Zorro Kamçılı Süvari (1969)
Zorro (1919–1959) (series), Johnston McCulley	Zorro'nun İntikamı (1970)
Zorro (1919–1959) (series), Johnston McCulley	Zorro, Rider of Vengeance (Italian: Zorro, il cavaliere della vendetta) (1971)
Zorro (1919–1959) (series), Johnston McCulley	Zorro the Invincible (Italian: Zorro, la maschera della vendetta) (1971)
Zorro (1919–1959) (series), Johnston McCulley	The Avenger, Zorro (Spanish: El Zorro justiciero, Italian: E continuavano a chiamarlo figlio di...) (1972)
Zorro (1919–1959) (series), Johnston McCulley	The Erotic Adventures of Zorro (1972)
Zorro (1919–1959) (series), Johnston McCulley	Red Hot Zorro (French: Les aventures galantes de Zorro) (1972)
Zorro (1919–1959) (series), Johnston McCulley	Man with the Golden Winchester (Italian: Il figlio di Zorro, Spanish: El hijo del Zorro) (1973)
Zorro (1919–1959) (series), Johnston McCulley	The Mark of Zorro (1974)
Zorro (1919–1959) (series), Johnston McCulley	The Great Adventure of Zorro (Spanish: La gran aventura del Zorro) (1974)
Zorro (1919–1959) (series), Johnston McCulley	Grandson of Zorro (1975)
Zorro (1919–1959) (series), Johnston McCulley	Zorro (1975; Italian)
Zorro (1919–1959) (series), Johnston McCulley	Zorro (1975; Hindi)
Zorro (1919–1959) (series), Johnston McCulley	Mark of Zorro (Italian: Ah sì? E io lo dico a Zzzzorro!) (1975)
Zorro (1919–1959) (series), Johnston McCulley	Zorro, The Gay Blade (1981)
Zorro (1919–1959) (series), Johnston McCulley	The Mask of Zorro (1998)
Zorro (1919–1959) (series), Johnston McCulley	The Amazing Zorro (2002)
Zorro (1919–1959) (series), Johnston McCulley	The Legend of Zorro (2005)

== See also ==
- Lists of literature made into feature films
  - Lists of works of fiction made into feature films
  - List of children's books made into feature films
  - List of non-fiction works made into feature films
  - List of comics and comic strips made into feature films
  - List of plays adapted into feature films (disambiguation)
  - List of films based on poems
