= Goetsch =

Goetsch or Götsch is a German surname. Notable people with the surname include:

- Christa Goetsch (born 1952), German politician
- Ernst Gotsch (born 1948), Swiss farmer
- Johann Heinrich Wilhelm Goetsch (1887–1960), German entomologist
- Léna Goetsch (born 1999), French footballer
- Philip Götsch (born 1984), Italian sky runner
- Robert Goetsch, American politician
