= Liolaemus goetschi =

Conservation status
- Least Concern (IUCN 3.1)

Scientific classification
- Kingdom: Animalia
- Phylum: Chordata
- Class: Reptilia
- Order: Squamata
- Suborder: Iguania
- Family: Liolaemidae
- Genus: Liolaemus
- Species: L. goetschi

Binomial name
- Liolaemus goetschi L. Müller & Hellmich, 1938

Species of lizard

Liolaemus goetschi is a species of lizard in the family Liolaemidae. It is endemic to Argentina.

== Etymology ==
The specific name, goetschi, is in honor of Wilhelm Goetsch, who was a German herpetologist and entomologist.

== Geographic range ==
L. goetschi is found in the Argentinian provinces of Neuquén and Río Negro.

== Habitat ==
The preferred natural habitats of L. goetschi are grassland and shrubland, at altitudes of 300–700 m (980–2,300 ft).

== Description ==
L. goetschi may attain a snout-to-vent length (SVL) of about 7.5 cm (3.0 in). It has a patch of enlarged scales on the posterior surface of the femur.

== Diet ==
L. goetschi is omnivorous.

== Reproduction ==
L. goetschi is oviparous.

== Taxonomy ==
L. goetschi belongs to the L. boulengeri species group.
