= Timothy Watson =

British actor

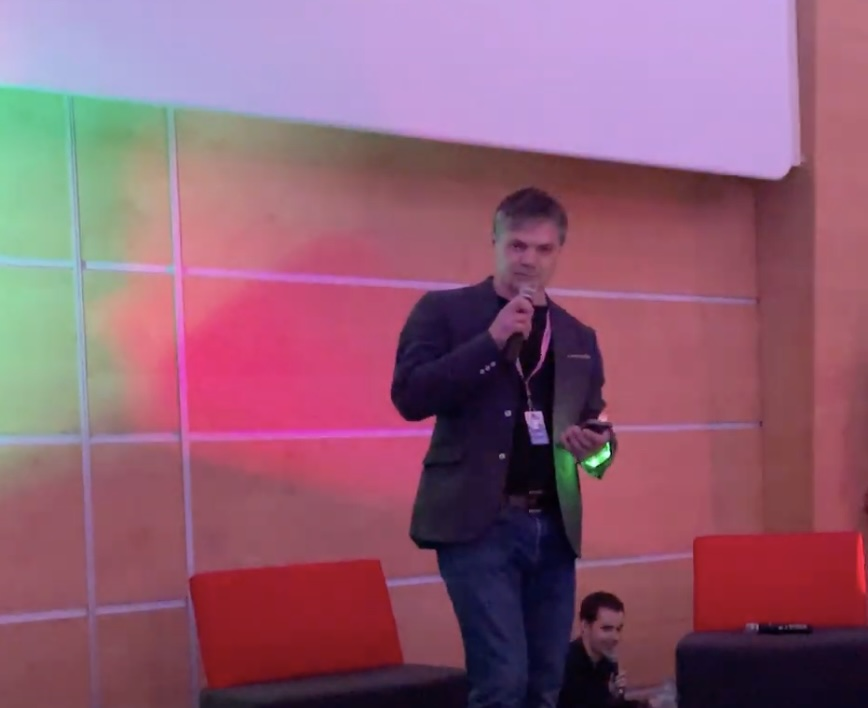
- Watson in 2022
- Born: Berkshire, England
- Education: Central School of Speech and Drama
- Occupation: Actor
- Spouse: Helen Grace
- Children: 2

Timothy Watson is a British actor best known for his role as Rob Titchener in BBC Radio 4's long-running soap opera The Archers, and voice roles as Mumkhar in Xenoblade Chronicles and Urianger Augurelt in Final Fantasy XIV.

== Early life ==
Watson was born in Berkshire, England, and grew up in Hertfordshire. He studied at the Central School of Speech and Drama in London from the age of 17.

== Career ==
Before becoming known for The Archers, Watson was an experienced theatre and radio actor, appearing in numerous other radio dramas for the BBC, including adaptations of Return of the Native, Wives and Daughters and A Dance to the Music of Time. He starred with Honeysuckle Weeks in the 2008 BBC Radio 4 drama The Incomparable Witness, about the case of murderer Dr Crippen.

On stage, he appeared in A Midsummer Night's Dream at the Open Air Theatre, Regents Park, An Inspector Calls in the West End, and several seasons of The Woman In Black.

An early screen role came in The Tenth Man (1988). On television, he played the role of the Maitre d' of the Palm Court Restaurant, Mr Perez, in the first series of Mr Selfridge.

Watson voiced the characters of both James Bond and Auric Goldfinger in the 2012 video game 007 Legends based on the James Bond movies. He voiced the characters Mumkhar and Metal Face in the video game Xenoblade Chronicles. He replaced Gideon Emery as the voice of the character Urianger in Final Fantasy XIV, as well as various other characters throughout the game's service including Susano, Thunder God Cid, and Hector (Brute Bomber). He voiced Leon Bronev in the Professor Layton game series. In 2014, he voiced Elohim in the video game The Talos Principle.

Watson joined The Archers playing Rob Titchener in 2013. In 2015, the audience at the Radio Times Festival greeted him by booing in response to the plotline involving his character. He later reportedly told The Observer's Vanessa Thorpe, "I have now removed all social media from my house because some of the things people said were quite awful. […] The strength of feeling took me by surprise. And then it starts to impact on your own personal life. I would rather not see it." The same year, he appeared in the National Theatre's production of The Beaux' Stratagem.

In February 2017, to mark the end of his time on the programme, Watson participated in live interviews to answer BBC Radio 4 listeners' questions about his experience of acting in The Archers. The following year, he played the part of Sbirro in Stanley Ellin's short story The Speciality of the House and the title character in Carl Stephenson's Leiningen Versus the Ants, in a series of Halloween-themed radio adaptations for BBC Radio 4's 15 Minute Drama programme, based on the second book in the Pan Book of Horror Stories series. On stage, he played Sir Robert Morton in The Winslow Boy at the Chichester Festival Theatre.

In 2022, he appeared in Agatha Christie's Murder on the Orient Express (Chichester Festival Theatre, then Bath Theatre Royal).

Watson briefly returned to The Archers in 2023, when Rob Titchener was diagnosed with an inoperable brain tumour and died.

In 2025, Watson played Norfolk in A Man For All Seasons (Bath Theatre Royal)., and in 2026, he played Christopher Riley in Shadowlands with Hugh Bonneville (Aldwych Theatre).

== Personal life ==
Watson is married to former actress Helen Grace, who now works in the travel industry. They live in West Sussex and have two children; one is a musician.

Watson has written several travel articles about his family holidays.

He is a vegetarian. In 2016, speaking about The Archers, he told Radio Times' David Brown, "I support Compassion in World Farming. I hate mega dairies, they're appalling things. I've got no interest in country pursuits, I've never held a cricket bat, even though as Rob I've managed to cheat during the single wickets in Ambridge. And I hate hunting. I would probably have been standing with the hunt saboteurs instead of falsely accusing one of assaulting me. So the real me probably wouldn't fare too well in Ambridge."
