= Career in C Major =

American opera-themed novella

Career in C Major is an opera-themed novella by American writer James M. Cain, first published in 1938. First appearing as a serial in The American Magazine entitled "Two Can Sing", this comic romance is a departure from Cain's first novels, The Postman Always Rings Twice (1934) and Double Indemnity (1936), both hardboiled crime stories that included premeditated murder. Redbook magazine, disappointed that Cain had exchanged his hard-boiled themes involving sex and murder for a "comedic adventure", declined to purchase the novella but Liberty obtained the piece and carried it as a serial in 1935.

The story was included with two of Cain's depression era novels in 1943 in a collection entitled Three of a Kind. Career in C Major was adapted to film in 1938 by Twentieth Century Fox as Wife, Husband and Friend, and again in 1949 as Everybody Does It.

== Plot summary ==
Leonard Borland, an able and handsome 33-year-old, is a building contractor whose formally lucrative business partnership has collapsed due to the Great Depression. His pretty and pampered wife, Doris, ranks in the Social Register. She spends freely, even as Leonard's business and her own family's fortune declines. Leonard, of working class origins, despises her culturally refined and self-complacent friends, who reciprocate in kind. Married for seven years, the 26-year-old Doris cultivates a myth that she sacrificed a promising career as an opera singer when she married Leonard. Her intellectual dishonesty and sexual manipulations short-circuit the intimacy and comradeship her husband longs for. Under the auspices of a former voice master, the talented Hugo Lorentz, Doris informs Leonard that due to his failure to properly provide for her, she is forced to seek a career as a professional singer.

Doris begins recitals after three months of training with Lorentz. She actively promotes paid attendance from friends and family members, and insists that Leonard do the same. She enlists him in a humiliating visit to the home of a well-known music critic Rudolph Hertz to elicit a favorable review, and is sharply rebuffed. Though no musical connoisseur, Leonard secretly perceives that his wife's singing is "lousy" and strongly suspects that her mentor, Lorentz, is fully aware of this.

After the recital, Leonard receives a phone call from a personal friend of the critic, a 28-year-old soprano named Cecil Carver, who had observed his visit. She invites Leonard to her home, promising him an assessment of his wife's performance. When together, she tactfully makes some observations about Doris, praising the quality of her voice, but criticizing her style.

Carver is suddenly notified that the lyrics to a song she must perform that night not will not be delivered in time. Serendipitously, Leonard knows the words to the old Navy song in question, and with Carner at the piano, he sings it. Carver is dumbstruck. She explains to the perplexed Leonard that he possesses a rare and powerful baritone. She seduces him, though Leonard is still "crazy" about his wife. Cecil reveals that Lorentz confessed to her that he was infatuated with a married woman: Doris Borland. Leonard concludes that Lorentz is manipulating his wife, but Cecil corrects him: Doris is using Lorentz, as she is manipulating a number of men, but short of providing sexual favors in return, satisfied to see them suffer in thrall to her physical beauty.

Cecil offers Leonard the means of disciplining his wife. She will provide the training to develop his unique baritone, and use her connections in the opera establishment to arrange a debut at Carnegie Hall with the Philharmonic Orchestra. In that venue she will showcase Leonard's talent to the critics and thus garner Doris' respect. They make a pact, with Cecil compensated exclusively by sex.

Leonard embarks on his education, auditing classes at Juilliard School, studying sight-reading, harmony, piano, and discovering the classical music of 19th Century Europe. Leonard is a quick study and soon discovers the tremendous capacity of his voice. As his own insights into the performance of music, he realizes how inept and shallow Doris is technically and interpretively. Leonard becomes convinced that his singing is superior to that of Doris.

Leonared receives a telegram from Cecil, imploring him to come immediately to Rochester, New York to replace an incapacitated singer. He joins Cecil, and discovers his debut will be that night. Dismayed, she sternly warns him that he must conquer the audience or face defeat. Cecil gives Leonard a rigorous pre-performance briefing in her hotel room. Her directives are limited to his actions on the stage, not his singing: entrance and exit protocols, poise and presentation, and his rapport with his piano accompanist, Ray Wilkins.

Cecil and Leonard arrive at the hall. As it fills to capacity, Leonard's anxiety mounts. When he steps before the audience for the first of his two scheduled solo sets, stage fright grips him. In a panic, he finds himself unable to modulate voice and tempo, "bellowing" his 17th Century musical selections. He exits the stage in disgrace. Cecil is disgusted and distraught. As per the program notes Leonard is obligated to make a second appearance that night. Disengaged from the audience due to his initial failure, Leonard finds his voice and his phrasing. His superb baritone emerges and shouts of "bravo" ring from the audience. He finishes his set in triumph and is welcomed back for an encore. Cecil generously joins him on stage for a duet. Leonard continues on tour with Cecil, ostensibly on a business trip. His numerous telegrams to Doris, concealing his activities, go unanswered.

Cecil is under contract to a grand opera impresario. She arranges a generous four-week contract for Leonard to sing with the company in Chicago. He is allotted the principal baritone roles in La bohème, Rigoletto and La Traviata. Leonard's overall performances are serviceable, but his part in the final O Mimi duet is superb and the audience goes wild. Post-performance, his dressing room is swamped with admirers. Two weeks later, he is offered a contract, but declines. Despite the promise of fame and fortune, he prefers to return to his contracting career.

When Leonard returns to his home in New York City, he discovers that Doris had just "got the bird": The audience at a matinee recital react against her inflated publicity and boo her off the stage before she can sing. Hysterical, Doris collapses and Leonard takes her home in an ambulance. The couple have a rapprochement, in which Doris confesses her lack of musical talent and apologizes for her feigned infidelities. She pledges her love to Leonard. Cecil and Leonard make a clean break without recriminations. Cecil warns him that his wife has not yet been reformed, and adds that their affair is over: "don't come back."

Despite her public humiliation that morning, Doris insists that she and Leonard honor a cocktail party invitation that evening. Among friends, she admits her failure as a professional singer. Unexpectedly, Cecil Carver arrives, invited by the host to perform a short recital. Doris, a great admirer of Cecil's talent, is abashed. Reassured by Leonard that Doris knows nothing of their former relationship, Cecil consoles Doris. Doris reacts to her good-natured sympathy with cynical scorn and declares she will persist in her professional singing. Leonard realizes that his wife has reverted to type. When Cecil selects Lorentz, who Doris still considers one of her conquests, to be her piano accompanist, Doris' hostility turns to rage. She accuses Cecil of "trying to steal my men." Her accusation is directed only towards Lorentz, but Cecil misapprehends the remark and assumes Leonard has told Doris about her affair with Leonard. Cecil's undisguised shock and Leonard's helpless denial reveals their infidelity to Doris.

When Cecil desperately explains that she and Leonard had merely been singing "in the same opera company" Doris, incredulous, bursts into peals of derisive laughter. Guests gather around and the host insultingly suggests that Leonard demonstrate his purported operatic skills. Provoked, Leonard enlists pianist Wilkins to accompany him in the prologue from Leoncavallo's Pagliacci. Cecil cautions him not to proceed, but he sings. His delivery of the famed baritone part is impeccable. Doris staggers from the penthouse speechless. When Leonard arrives home, Doris lunges at him, tearing his face with her fingernails. Bleeding, he flees from the house and spends the night in a cheap hotel. His reckless musical exhibition haunts him, as does his alienation from Doris.

Disgusted with singing, he turns down a lucrative offer to perform at the famed New York Hippodrome. When Doris vindictively draws all the money out of their joint bank account, he reconsiders and accepts the position. With coaching, he adds to his repertoire Cavalleria rusticana" and Rigoletto.

Supremely confident of his singing abilities, Leonard gives a bravura performance in the first acts of Rigoletto. In the final act, the crowd goes wild and stops the show. When the singers resume, an error in sequence occurs, and Leonard loses his way in the score. Panicking, he proceeds to "bellow" even after the conductor stops the orchestra. The audience jeers with contempt: he gets "the bird" and flees from the stage. Cecil finds him cowering in the stairwell, and implores him not to go "yellow." Leonard refuses, and his co-singers shun him. In the dressing room Leonard confesses to himself that "I was just another Doris. I had everything but what it takes."

Doris, who had left the theater early, is alerted to the catastrophe. She hurries to Leonard's dressing room to provide moral support. She takes him home. they are reconciled, and their forays into theater careers mutually recognized as misadventures. In the apartment lobby, Leonard's business partner intercepts them and announces that a major federal government building contract awaits them in Alabama. Leonard and Doris board a southbound train to pursue a happy and thoroughly conventional married life.

== Background ==
In the late 1930s, Cain's chief literary preoccupations revolved around professional singing and music. His mother, Rose Mallahan Cain, had trained as a coloratura soprano in her youth, and Cain briefly studied to become an opera singer in his early twenties; neither mother or son attained professional singing careers. Cain commented on his mother's influence on his literary topics:

It is true that I write about singers, but not, you will notice, swooning over their voices. Real dramatization is focused on their minds, their skill at reading music, and improvising to cover emergencies at comprehension...This, I suspect, is all a bouquet on the grave of my mother. She had a beautiful voice, a big hot lyric endlessly trained and equal to any music written for soprano...

As a newspaper columnist in the 1920s and 30s, Cain frequently wrote critiques on composers and musical genres. With playwright Henry Meyers, Cain sponsored musical gatherings at his Belden Drive home in Burbank, California. The topic of opera singing remained integral to Cain's literary interests.

== Themes ==
In this comedic novella, opera serves as a sexual metaphor, in which the humorous plot devices conflicts with the sharp sexual tensions. Leonard Borland's "dormant masculinity" emerges under the musical and sexual direction of coloratura diva Cecil Carver. When he discovers his talent as a professional baritone, he tells Cecil "if I'm a man, you made me one." Biographer Paul Skenazy observes that Career in C Major abandons the hard-boiled genre. Nevertheless, "Cain attempts to give a tough-guy veneer to the opera stage by using metaphors of violence and competition to speak of both marriage and singing." The story ends with a paean to conventional marriage as "The Borlands are ultimately shown to be inept singers adequate only to each other."

== Critical assessment ==
Rejected by Liberty magazine because it lacked hardboiled themes, Career in C Major "created a mild sensation" when it appeared in The American Magazine in 1938. The editor of the journal encouraged Cain to create similar pieces, reporting that the work "is the most popular short novel we have ever published." Cain himself modestly confided to H. L. Mencken that Career in C Major "is merely a pleasant tale with no murders in it."

Biographer Ray Hoopes considers Career in C Major a clear demonstration of Cain's command of sustained comedic writing. Biographer Paul Skenazy objects to the conventionality of Cain's social outlook, citing the novella's "perverse praise" of "marriage, love and family":

Fulfillment comes in monogamy, sobriety, and lifelong companionship - admirable values, to be sure, and ones dear to Cain's heart, but not the ideas that most animated his [literary] imagination."

Skenazy adds that "The whole adventure is so implausible that one soon loses interest in the characters...The novella ends in an absurd flurry of convenient coincidences [ending with a] Deus ex machina ..."

== Film adaptations ==
Cain wrote his Career in C Major (at the time titled "Two Can Sing") in four weeks and it was immediately acquired for adaptation by 20th Century Fox for $8000. Cain used the funds to finance a trip to Mexico which would result in his famed novel Serenade (1937).

The first of two film adaptations appeared in 1939: Wife, Husband and Friend (1939), starring Loretta Young and Warner Baxter. Previewed at Grauman's Chinese Theatre, the film garnered critical success. Though unrewarding financially for Cain, the second adaption of Career in C Minor, Everybody Does It (1949), starring Linda Darrell and Paul Douglas, was considered "by almost every reviewer's appraisal a hilarious comedy."

== Sources ==
- Hoopes, Roy. 1981. The Baby in the Icebox and Other Short Fiction by James M. Cain. Holt, Rinehart & Winston. New York. ISBN 0-03058501-5
- Hoopes, Roy. 1982. Cain. Holt, Rinehart and Winston. New York. ISBN 0-03-049331-5
- Hoopes, Roy. 1986. Career in C Major and Other Fiction. McGraw-Hill Book Company. New York. ISBN 0-07-009593-0
- Madden, David. 1970. James M. Cain. Twayne Publishers, Inc. Library Catalog Card Number: 78-120011.
- Marling, William. 2012. James M. Cain. https://web.archive.org/web/20140614121023/http://www.detnovel.com/Cain_James.html
- Skenazy, Paul. 1989. James M. Cain. Continuum Publishing Company. New York. ISBN 0-8044-2821-2
