= Helen Grace =

British actress

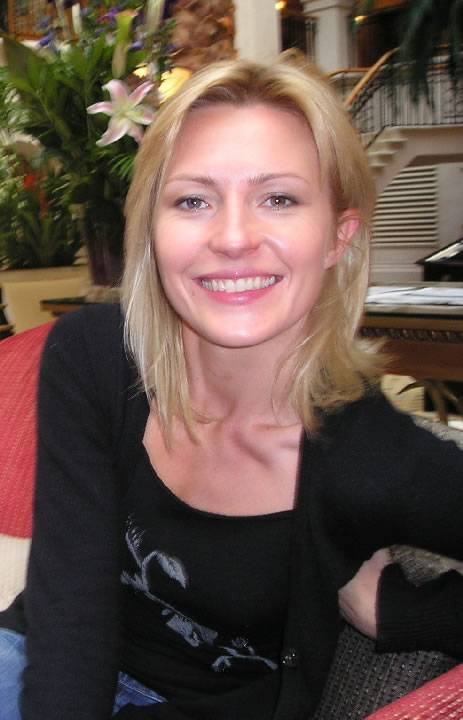
- Grace in 2003
- Born: Helen Victoria Scragg; 20 August 1971 (age 54); Watford, Hertfordshire, England
- Occupation: Actress
- Years active: 1996–2016
- Spouse: Timothy Watson
- Children: 2

Helen Grace (born Helen Victoria Scragg; 20 August 1971) is a former actress. She played Georgia Simpson on the Channel 4 soap Brookside.

== Early life ==
Grace was born in Watford, Hertfordshire, England, she grew up in Northwood, attended St. Helen's School, and was brought up as an only child by her mother after her father's death. She acted, skied and played the piano from an early age, and chose to pursue acting rather than study medicine. After studying Psychology at Durham University, she worked as a waitress and in accounts for an advertising agency to pay for drama school, then trained at the Drama Centre London. She was advised to go by a more elegant surname professionally, and chose Grace because of its similar letters and length.

== Acting career ==
Grace's career began in 1996 with her role on Brookside as Georgia Simpson, who was in an incestuous relationship with her younger brother. The storyline attracted considerable public and press attention at the time. She was a guest on TFI Friday and appeared alongside fellow soap stars of the day Patsy Palmer and Tracy Shaw in a 1997 Vogue magazine issue celebrating British women, with Patsy Kensit on the cover.

Following Brookside, she appeared in two series' (1998 and 1999) of Roger Roger, a BBC1 sitcom written by John Sullivan, set in a London minicab firm; then as Jane Wilkinson in the Agatha Christie's Poirot episode Lord Edgware Dies (2000), and in a TV commercial for Virgin Trains with Rik Mayall. Other TV appearances include Bad Girls, Cold Feet, Watermelon, Midsomer Murders, Coronation Street, Respectable, Filth: The Mary Whitehouse Story, Lewis, Hollyoaks and Hetty Feather.

She had small parts in the films The Leading Man with Jon Bon Jovi, Shiner with Michael Caine, Hello Friend with Richard Ayoade, and in Killing Me Softly, ranked on Rotten Tomatoes as one of the worst films of all time.

On stage, she played Countess Florence, the wife of Gregor Antonescu (played by David Suchet), in a revival of Terence Rattigan's Man and Boy at the Duchess Theatre, London (2005). Other theatre work includes A Midsummer Night's Dream at the Open Air Theatre, Regents Park (1998), The Glass Menagerie at the Theatre Royal York (1999) alongside Honor Blackman, and Don Taylor's The Road to the Sea at the Orange Tree Theatre, Richmond (2003). In 2007–2008, she played the role of Marjorie Houseman (Baby's mother) in the stage version of Dirty Dancing at the Aldwych Theatre in London's West End.

== Post-acting career ==
During the 2010s, Grace left acting to study creative writing alongside raising a family, and wrote travel blog posts for a holiday company. She is now their head of marketing and communications.

== Personal life ==
Grace is married to the actor Timothy Watson. They live in West Sussex and have two children; one is a musician.
