= Joe Pichler =

American child actor missing since 2006

- Born: Joseph David Wolfgang Pichler; February 14, 1987; Bremerton, Washington, U.S.
- Disappeared: January 5, 2006 (aged 18); Bremerton, Washington, U.S.
- Status: Missing for 20 years, 9 months and 14 days
- Occupation: Actor
- Years active: 1996–2002
- Awards: Young Artist Award: Best Performance in a Feature Film or TV Movie - Young Ensemble; 1999 Shiloh 2

Joseph David Wolfgang Pichler (born February 14, 1987) is an American former child actor. He is best known for his roles in Varsity Blues (1999), Beethoven's 3rd (2000) and Beethoven's 4th (2001).

Pichler's last film credit was in the independent drama Children on Their Birthdays (2002). He went missing at age 18 under mysterious circumstances on January 5, 2006, near his hometown of Bremerton, Washington. His whereabouts remain unknown.

== Life and career ==
The fourth of five children, Pichler relocated to Los Angeles as a child to pursue his acting career. He had some success, most notably appearing in several movies and television shows. He is known for his recurring role as Brennan Newton in the third and fourth (direct-to-video) installments of the Beethoven movies—family-oriented comedies about the antics of a mischievous St. Bernard.

In 2003, at the insistence of his family, he returned to his hometown of Bremerton, Washington, about 16 miles (26 km) west of Seattle, and graduated from high school there in 2005. According to family, Pichler had planned to return to Los Angeles the following year, after his braces were removed, to resume his acting career. After turning 18, Pichler moved out of the family home and into his own apartment in Bremerton; however, he maintained a close relationship with his family.

== Disappearance ==
Pichler was last seen on January 5, 2006. According to the Charley Project, the friends who last saw him stated he was in good spirits while he was with them.

Pichler's silver 2005 Toyota Corolla was found on January 9, 2006, at an intersection near his home.

According to his family's statements to the media at the time, the last outgoing call on Pichler's cell phone was placed at 4:08 a.m., on January 5, to a friend who said he had been visiting with Pichler earlier in the day.

According to the Associated Press, Pichler's family stated that a note found in the car expressed a wish to be a "stronger brother" and asked that personal effects of Pichler's be given to a younger brother. The lead investigator on the case, Detective Robbie Davis, stated, "There’s a good indication that it might have been a suicide, but we don’t know that," adding that he did not see any evidence of foul play. However, Pichler's relatives disagreed with this view. His mother criticized investigators for giving the impression that they thought Pichler was dead, saying, "He could be in someone’s basement. He could be wandering the streets hurt."

In 2011, with Pichler still missing, his mother wrote that the case was handled "poorly by police," and added that, "Joseph is not a runaway; that's the only thing I know for sure about his disappearance. After nearly six years, we still have no resolution." As of 2026, Pichler remains classified as a missing person.

== Filmography ==
Year	Title	Role	Notes
1996	In the House	Bryan	Episode: "To Die For"
1996	Lois & Clark: The New Adventures of Superman	Little Boy	Episode: "Through a Glass, Darkly"
1996	The Fan	Sick Sean	
1997	Prison of Secrets	Zach	TV movie
1997	Gun	Tad	Episode: "The Hole"
1998	Touched by an Angel	Alex Craig	Episode: "The Trigger"
1998	Music From Another Room	Young Billy	
1999	Varsity Blues	Kyle Moxon	
1999	Shiloh 2: Shiloh Season	David Howard	
2000	Beethoven's 3rd	Brennan Newton	
2001	When Good Ghouls Go Bad	Danny Walker	TV movie
2001	Beethoven's 4th	Brennan Newton	
2002	The Nightmare Room	Gary	Episode: "Camp Nowhere" (Parts 1 and 2)
2002	Children on Their Birthdays	Billy Bob Murphy	
