= The Branded Sombrero =

1928 film

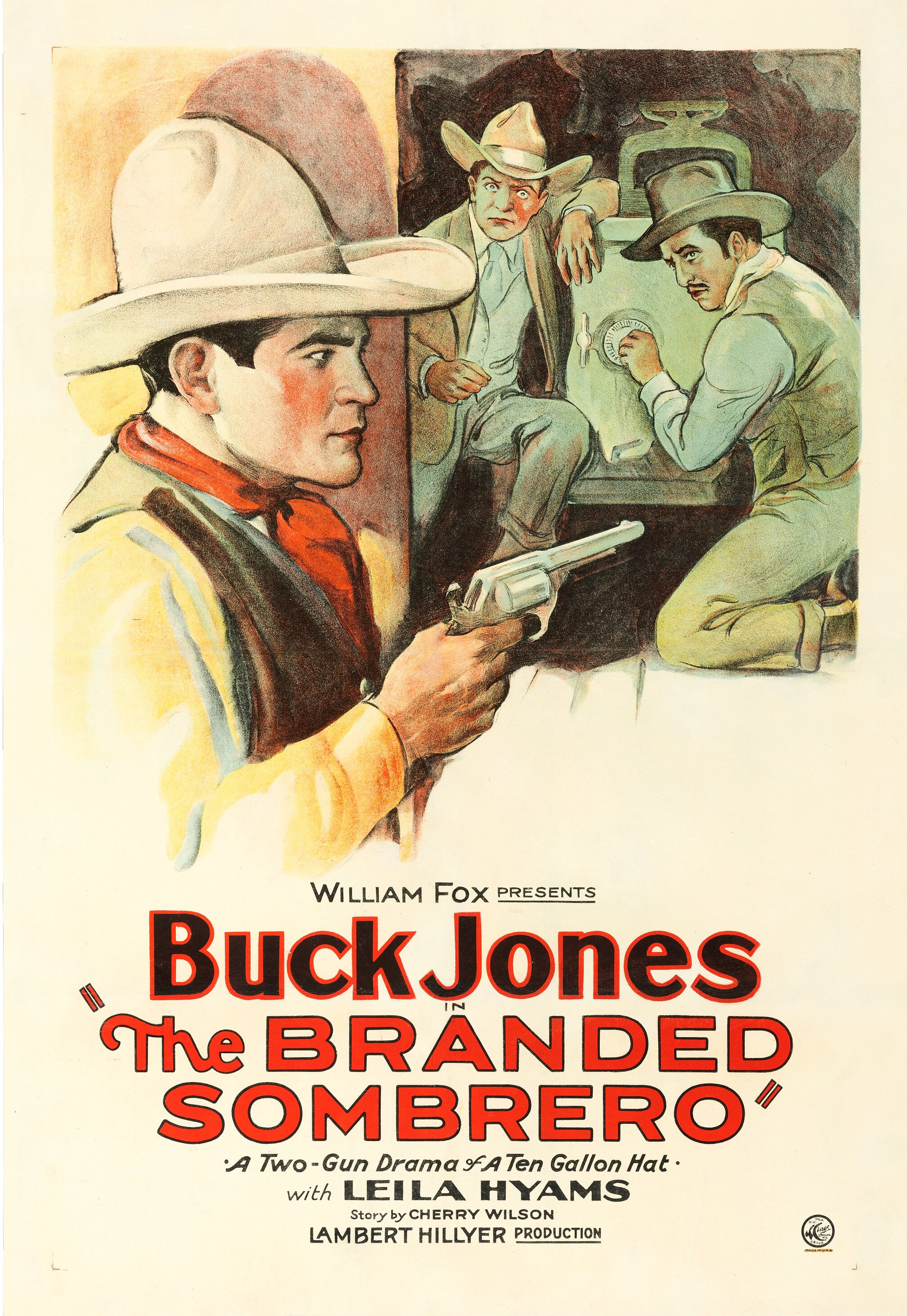
- Theatrical release poster
- Directed by: Lambert Hillyer
- Screenplay by: Lambert Hillyer; James Kevin McGuinness
- Story by: Cherry Wilson
- Starring: Buck Jones; Leila Hyams; Jack Baston; Stanton Heck; Francis Ford; Josephine Borio
- Cinematography: Reginald Lyons
- Edited by: J. Logan Pearson
- Production company: Fox Film Corporation
- Distributed by: Fox Film Corporation
- Release date: January 8, 1928
- Running time: 58 minutes
- Country: United States
- Language: English

The Branded Sombrero is a 1928 American silent adventure film directed by Lambert Hillyer and written by Lambert Hillyer and James Kevin McGuinness. The film stars Buck Jones, Leila Hyams, Jack Baston, Stanton Heck, Francis Ford and Josephine Borio. The film was released on January 8, 1928, by Fox Film Corporation.

== Cast ==
- Buck Jones as Starr Hallett
- Leila Hyams as Connie Marsh
- Jack Baston as Charles Maggert
- Stanton Heck as Honest John Hallett
- Francis Ford as Link Jarvis
- Josephine Borio as Rosa
- Lew Kelly as Lane Hallett
