= The Naked Jungle =

1954 film by Byron Haskin

- 1960 reissue film poster
- Directed by: Byron Haskin
- Screenplay by: Ranald MacDougall; Ben Maddow; Philip Yordan
- Based on: Leiningen Versus the Ants by Carl Stephenson
- Produced by: George Pal
- Starring: Eleanor Parker; Charlton Heston; Abraham Sofaer; William Conrad
- Cinematography: Ernest Laszlo
- Edited by: Everett Douglas
- Music by: Daniele Amfitheatrof
- Color process: Technicolor
- Production company: Paramount Pictures
- Distributed by: Paramount Pictures
- Release date: March 3, 1954
- Running time: 95 minutes
- Country: United States
- Language: English
- Box office: $2.3 million (US/Canada rentals)

The Naked Jungle is a 1954 American adventure film directed by Byron Haskin, and starring Charlton Heston and Eleanor Parker. Telling the story of an attack of army ants on a Brazilian cocoa plantation, it was based on the 1937 short story "Leiningen Versus the Ants" by Carl Stephenson.

== Plot ==
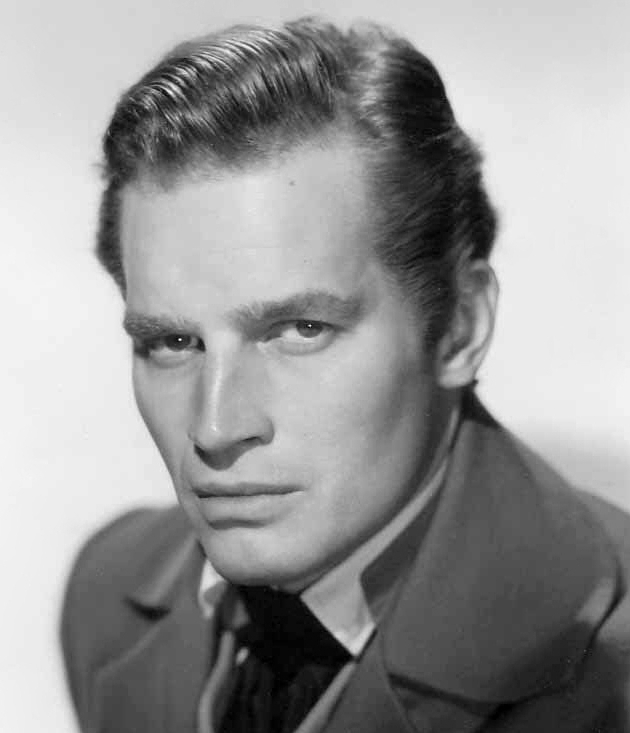
Charlton Heston plays Christopher Leiningen, a self-made man who carved a plantation out of the wilderness and then sent for a bride as a helpmate to share his fortune.

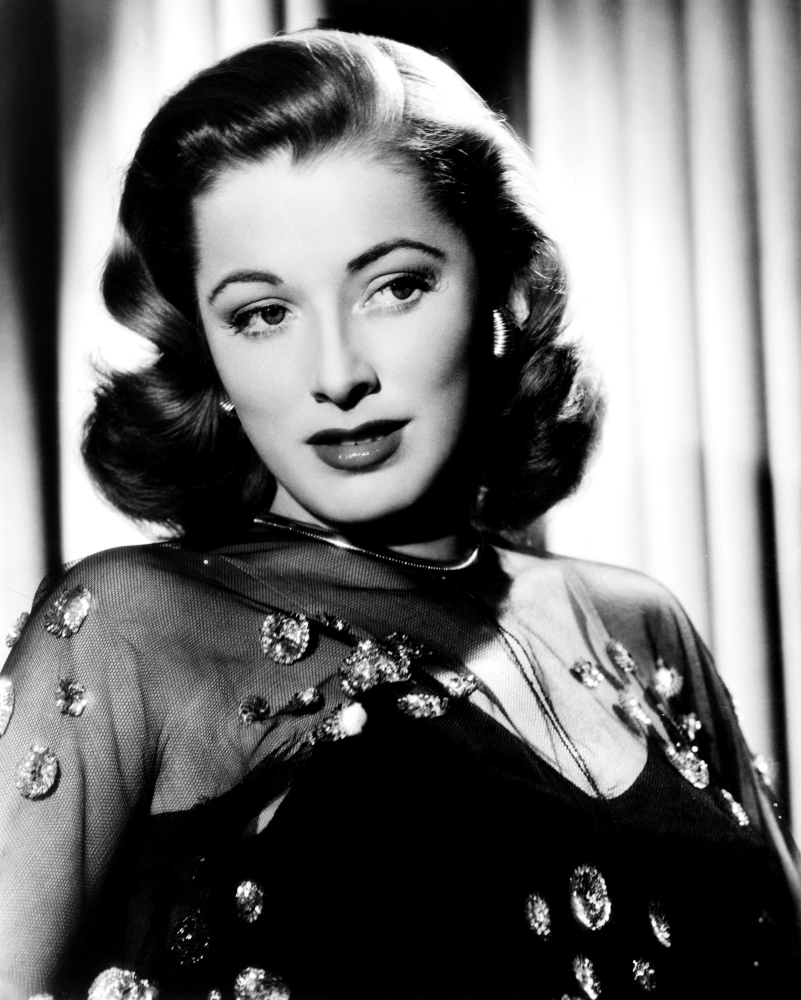
Eleanor Parker plays Joanna Selby Leiningen, who asked by Leiningen's brother to help screen applicants for an arranged marriage, chooses herself as the superior choice.

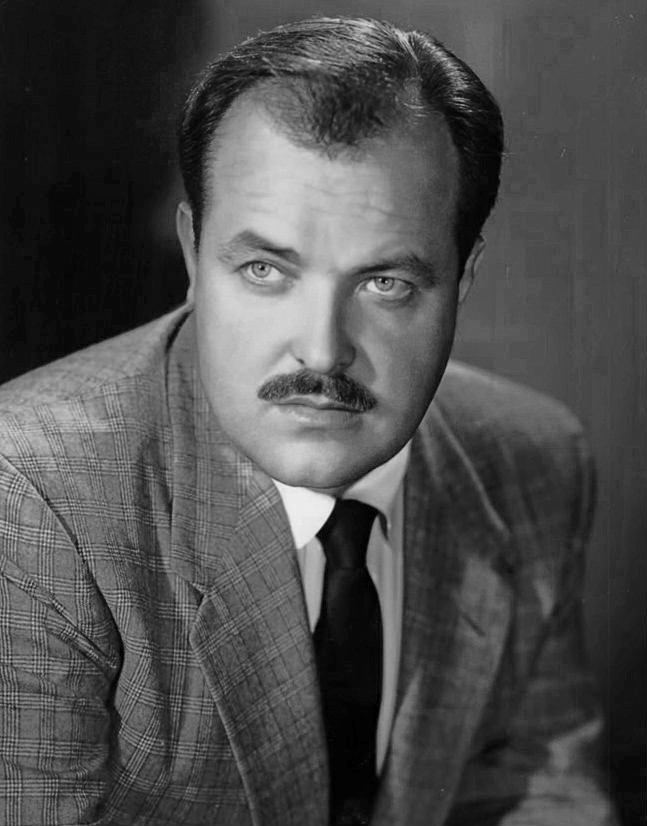
William Conrad plays the Commissioner, who warns of the 30-mile-wide swath of marabunta headed in their direction.

In 1901, Joanna Selby is on her way from New Orleans to a South American cocoa plantation to meet her new husband, whom she married by proxy, plantation owner Christopher Leiningen. On a boat up the river to the Leiningen plantation, Joanna meets the local Commissioner, who informs her that he is aware of her circumstances, having stood in for her as the bride during the proxy ceremony. When Joanna asks him to tell her about her new husband, the Commissioner responds that in a month's time she will be able to tell him more than he knows now. The marriage has been arranged by Leiningen's brother in New Orleans, who had asked Joanna's assistance in screening applications for the arranged marriage. Impressed by Christopher Leiningen's characteristics as a strong self-made man, Joanna proposes herself as the choice. Joanna is beautiful, independent, and arrives ready to be Christopher's stalwart helpmate.

On meeting Joanna at her arrival, Christopher is cold and remote, studying her manners and testing her French language, piano skills, and conversational abilities to determine whether she is as portrayed. Displaying a flash of anger, Joanna insists that she is exactly as screened. Wary that she is too good to be true, Christopher expresses that there must be a reason why she has agreed to become the wife of a stranger. Surprised, Joanna responds that she was left a widow with her husband's debts, which his brother already knew. Christopher expresses surprise that his brother would have chosen her, knowing his attitude. Joanna admits that his brother was hesitant, but she convinced him that she was the superior choice. Upset that she is a widow, Christopher expresses disdainfully that all his carefully chosen and valuable possessions are new, nothing previously owned. At the piano, Joanna expresses that his is not a first-rate piano; a good piano plays better when it has been played.

Christopher remains cold, rebuffing all her attempts to make friends with him. There is a strong sexual tension, with Christopher making one clumsy, forceful advance one evening when drunk. When Joanna rebuffs his demanding embrace, Christopher declares that the marriage will not work, and she must leave. Boldly Joanna expresses that she realizes his rejection is due to insecurity at his lack of sexual experience. Christopher admits that he has neither frequented brothels nor exploited native women, as most planters do.

As Joanna awaits the boat to take her back to the United States, the Commissioner arrives to visit and informs Christopher that a 30-mile-wide swath of army ants, known as marabunta, is headed in their direction. Though there has been a mutual softening of their relationship, Christopher decides to take Joanna to a port where she can catch an earlier boat for her own safety. When native workers begin to desert the plantation, Joanna refuses to leave, telling Christopher that none of his workers will stay if they see his wife desert. Impressed by her shrewdness and determination, Christopher expresses admiration for her courage, warning her that she will need it if she stays.

Instead of evacuating, Christopher resolves to make a stand against this indomitable natural predator. Joanna joins the fight to save the plantation. The ants take several days to arrive and during that time their joint effort brings the couple closer, with respect and love beginning to blossom. Christopher resorts to blowing up a timber dam to flood his own estate, washing the ants away. Alive together amid the ruined plantation, Christopher and Joanna resolve to reclaim the plantation and rebuild a life together.

== Cast ==
- Eleanor Parker as Joanna Leiningen (Selby)
- Charlton Heston as Christopher Leiningen
- Abraham Sofaer as Incacha
- William Conrad as Commissioner
- Romo Vincent as Boat Captain
- Douglas Fowley as Medicine Man
- John Dierkes as Gruber
- Leonard Strong as Kutina
- Norma Calderón as Zala
- Pilar Del Rey as Indian Wife
- Bernie Gozier as Gruber's Indian
- Jerry Groves as Gruber's Indian
- Leon Lontoc as Indian
- John Mansfield as Foreman
- Ronald Alan Numkena as Indian Boy
- Rodd Redwing as Indian
- Jack Reitzen as Fat Man
- Carlos Rivero as Indian Husband

== Production ==
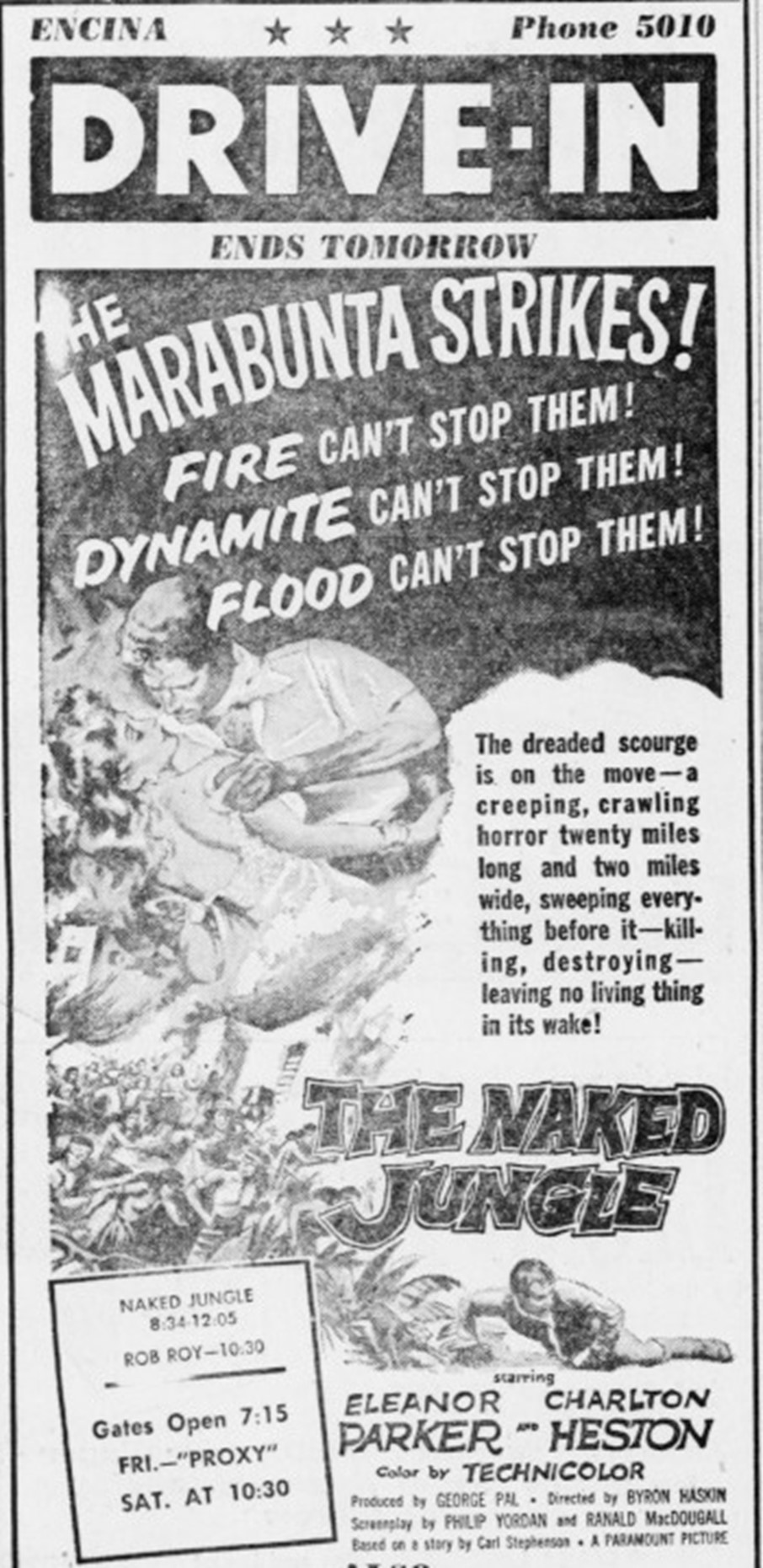
Drive-in advertisement from 1954.

George Pal had a good experience working on Houdini with writer Phil Yordan and asked Yordan if the author knew of any short stories that might make good films. Yordan told him "Leiningen Versus the Ants" but said he had been unable to find the author. Pal succeeded in doing this and obtained the rights for $6,000. In November 1952, Pal announced he would adapt the short story "Leiningen Versus the Ants" into a feature film, with Yordan to write the screenplay.

Paramount wanted Joseph H. Lewis to direct but he clashed with Pal and Byron Haskin was hired instead.

In March 1953, Charlton Heston was announced as the male lead. In May 1953, Teddi Sherman was reportedly working on the script. The screenplay was co-written by Ranald MacDougall and the blacklisted writer Ben Maddow.

William Conrad, who had starred as Leiningen in adaptations of Stephenson's story for the radio programs Escape and Suspense, appears in the film as the district commissioner (this was announced in July 1953).

The unique "sound" of the ants devouring everything in their path was created by swirling a straw in a glass of water with crushed ice, which was then amplified. Much of the Rio Negro (Amazon) jungle riverscape, as well as the bridge dynamiting and sluice scenes, are second-unit stock footage shot in Florahome, Florida.

== Radio adaptations ==
The film was adapted for radio on the June 7, 1954 broadcast of the Lux Radio Theatre; Charlton Heston reprised his role as "Leiningen" and Donna Reed played "Joanna".

Prior adaptations of Leiningen Versus the Ants for the January 14, 1948 broadcast of Escape and the radio program Suspense.

== Impact ==
A scene from the film was used in the 1971 film The Hellstrom Chronicle.

The film strongly influenced the 1985 MacGyver episode "Trumbo's World", which also featured clips from the film.

In 1978, Martin Scorsese listed the film as among his "100 Random Pleasures" in a section of films which "are not good. They're guilty. But there are things in them that make you like them, that make them worthwhile."

In 1982, the film is referenced by Fort Worth, TX Hip Pocket Theater in their musical Sex Kittens go to College. In a short scene, a man points to a floating leaf and exclaimed "Look, no marabunta!" and then sings a short piece called No Marabunta Tonight. (Available on YouTube)

== Broadcast ==
In 1970, it aired on WVUE-TV in New Orleans, Louisiana, as part of its highly publicized switch of channel positions with that city's PBS member station, WYES-TV.
