= Leiningen Versus the Ants =

1938 short story by Carl Stephenson

- Short story by Carl Stephenson
- Original title: Leiningens Kampf mit den Ameisen
- Country: Germany
- Language: German
- Genres: Adventure, horror, short story

Publication
- Published in: Die Neue Linie
- Publication type: Magazine
- Media type: Print
- Publication date: 1937

"Leiningen Versus the Ants" (German: "Leiningens Kampf mit den Ameisen") is a short story by Carl Stephenson, published in German in 1937. A translation, probably by Stephenson himself, was published in the December 1938 edition of Esquire.

== Plot summary ==
Leiningen, the owner of a plantation in the Brazilian rainforest, is warned by the district commissioner that a swarm of ferocious and organised soldier ants is approaching and that he must flee. Unlike his neighbours, Leiningen is not about to give up years of hard work and planning to "an act of God", as he believes in the superiority of the human brain and has already made preparations. He convinces his workers to stay and fight with him.

When the ants reach his estate, Leiningen seals it by filling a moat that surrounds it on four sides, the fourth being a river. The ants attempt to cross over by covering the waters with tree leaves, but he thwarts them repeatedly by emptying then flooding the moat. Eventually, the ants breach that line of defence and the men retreat behind a second moat, this time filled with petrol. Leiningen is able to incinerate several waves of attack, but runs out of petrol when the pumps malfunction.

After days of hard fighting, the ants breach the last defenses, and all seems lost. However, Leiningen realizes that his original principle of canals and damming can be put to use: if he dams the main river itself, the whole plantation will flood, drowning all the ants. He and his men can take refuge in the heights of the manor house on a hill. However, this plan requires reaching the dam, long overrun by the ants.

Leiningen puts on a makeshift protective suit, douses himself with petrol, picks up two spray cans of petrol and runs for the dam — through the ants. He reaches the dam controls and floods the plantation; this means the destruction of his year's crop, but it will save his men, preserve the contents of his granaries and destroy the menace of the ants. The climax of the story occurs on the return journey when he is knocked down by the ants and almost devoured. Thinking about a stag he had seen the ants devour to the bones, he forces himself to get up. Despite suffering horrible injuries, including ant bites to the inside of his nose and directly below his eyes, Leiningen continues running, reaches the concrete ditch with the blazing petrol and survives. At the story's end, Leiningen awakes while recovering from his injuries; his final words before going to sleep are: "I told you I would come back, even if I am a bit streamlined."

== History ==
The original short story was published in the lifestyle periodical Die Neue Linie in 1937 as "Leiningens Kampf mit den Ameisen". When it was published as an English translation in 1938, readers of Esquire were not told that it was a translation, nor did they know that Carl Stephenson was German. After the Second World War, Stephenson expanded the story into a larger novel which was published under different titles including Auf Leben und Tod, Sendboten der Hölle, and Marabunta. In these revised versions there were many changes that indicate that the original was influenced by Nazi political thought. Around the same time, the German entomologist Wilhelm Goetsch had published Die Staaten der Ameisen (1937), and his book was doubtless read by Stephenson, who included Goetsch as a character in his Marabunta. In his 1937 edition Goetsch ended his book with a line that indicated that ants were a model for humans to emulate. It ended with the line "in dem der eine schweigend verzichtet, der andere freudig opfert und gibt" ("some quietly renounce while others joyfully sacrifice and give") which was taken from Hitler's Mein Kampf. In 1953 Goetsch wrote a second edition which did not have this line, and this was translated into English. Geoffrey Winthrop-Young in an analysis of "Leiningen" and Goetsch's works notes that "In 1937 human reasoning power had yet to grasp the importance of sacrifice and subordination that is 'self-evident' to ants, but in 1953 'superior mental capacity' enables humans to comprehend what no ant will ever grasp: the importance of peace and detente." Stephenson was a Nazi party member (NSDAP number 6,127,698).

== Adaptations ==
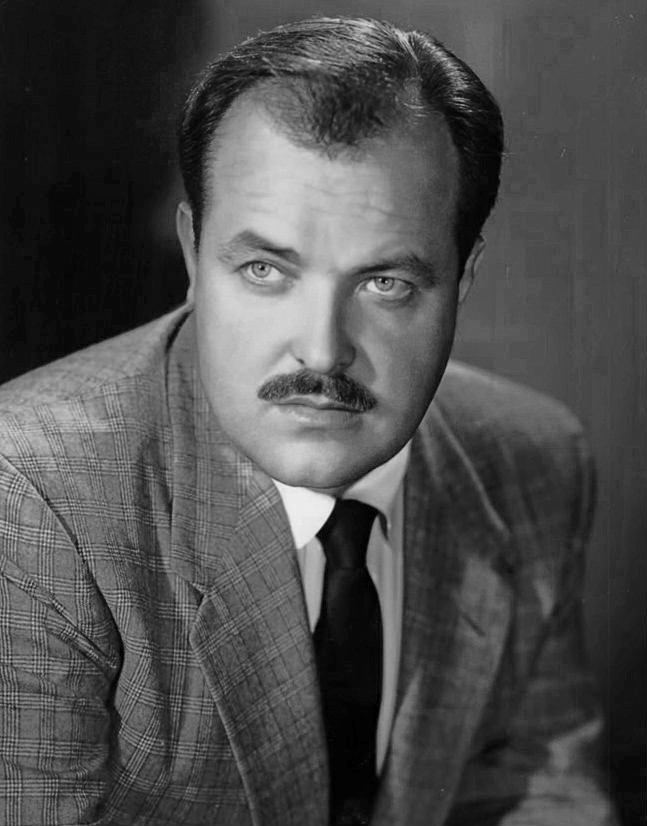
William Conrad, 1952

In 1948, the story was adapted as a radio play by Robert Ryf as part of the CBS Radio series, Escape with William Conrad providing the voice of Leiningen for the January 14th debut broadcast. Escape revived the story twice, first on May 23, 1948 (again with Conrad as Leiningen) and then on August 4, 1949 (with Tudor Owen as Leiningen). The Ryf script was again used as part of the CBS Radio series, Suspense; William Conrad again provided the voice of Leiningen for the August 25, 1957, episode and Luis van Rooten played Leiningen in the November 29, 1959, episode.

The story was adapted in 1954 by Ranald MacDougall and Ben Maddow into the film The Naked Jungle, starring Charlton Heston as Leiningen and Eleanor Parker as his mail order bride Joanna, and featuring William Conrad as the commissioner. Footage from the film was used in The Hellstrom Chronicle.

The story inspired "Trumbo's World", the sixth episode of the television series MacGyver, with stock footage from The Naked Jungle used in the episode.

It was parodied on the cartoon series Camp Candy. In "Candy and the Ants", John Candy is faced with a swarm of voracious "navy ants", which he finally repels by importing anteaters. ("What kind of barbarians are we dealing with?" screams the ant admiral.)

The humor magazine National Lampoon parodied the story in a short story called "Leiningen and the Snails", in which the title character faces a swarm of "army snails", and has "merely three weeks" to think of a way to defend the plantation. He eventually brings in by air enough garlic and butter to cook all the snails into escargot.

In November 2018, the short story was adapted for BBC Radio 4's 15 Minute Drama series with Timothy Watson playing the title character.
