= Children on Their Birthdays =

- Theatrical poster
- Directed by: Mark Medoff
- Screenplay by: Douglas Sloan
- Based on: "Children on Their Birthdays" by Truman Capote
- Produced by: William J. Immerman; Ginger T. Perkins
- Starring: Sheryl Lee; Joe Pichler; Jesse Plemons; Tania Raymonde; Christopher McDonald; Tom Arnold; Phyllis Frelich
- Cinematography: Steven Shaw
- Edited by: Sidney Levin
- Music by: J.D. Hinton; Ross Vannelli
- Production companies: Crusader Entertainment; Frantic Redhead Productions; Salem Productions
- Distributed by: Artisan Entertainment
- Release dates: March 23, 2002 (WorldFest Houston); October 18, 2002 (United States)
- Running time: 102 minutes
- Country: United States
- Language: English
- Box office: $54,912

Children on Their Birthdays is a 2002 American independent comedy drama film directed by Mark Medoff, and starring Sheryl Lee, Jesse Plemons, Joe Pichler, Tania Raymonde, Christopher McDonald, and Tom Arnold. The screenplay is adapted by Douglas Sloan from Truman Capote's 1948–1949 short story of the same title. This was the last film appearance by Pichler before his disappearance in 2006.

The film premiered at WorldFest Houston on March 23, 2002, and was given a limited theatrical release on October 18, 2002.

== Plot ==
In the summer of 1947, thirteen-year-old Lily Jane Bobbit has moved with her mute mother to small-town Medda, Alabama, next door to Billy Bob Murphy. Billy Bob develops a crush on Lily Jane, who is a self-possessed Southern belle. Preacher, Billy Bob's rowdy best friend, also takes a liking to Lily Jane, complicating the two boys' friendship. Meanwhile, Billy Bob has a hard time accepting the budding romance between Elinore, his war-widowed mother, and local mechanic Speedy Thorne, whom he and Preacher do odd jobs for.

The town is shaken up by the arrival of Lionel Quince, a con man. When the Quinces announce they are staging a talent contest, Lily Jane, who dreams of being an actress, enters the competition. When the grifters make off with the entry fees, it is up to Billy Bob and Preacher to catch up to the crooks.

== Cast ==
- Sheryl Lee as Elinore Murphy
- Jesse Plemons as Preacher Star
- Joe Pichler as Billy Bob Murphy
- Tania Raymonde as Lily Jane Bobbit
- Christopher McDonald as Speedy Thorne
- Tom Arnold as Lionel Quince
- Phyllis Frelich as Mrs. Bobbit
- Brazha L. Brewer as Rosalba Cat
- Marilyn Dodds Frank as Mrs. Quince

== Production ==
Seventy five per cent of the film was shot in Aurora at 506 W. Downer, the historic home built in 1867 by Nelson and Harriett (Hawley) Janes and at 65 S. View. The remnants of the tree house are still there. The premier was shown at the historic Paramount Theater, the same theater where Johnny Depp was filmed in Public Enemy., Lemont and Chicago, Illinois.

== Critical reception ==
Joe Leydon of Variety gave the film a positive review, calling it an "unassuming, charming period piece". He added, "Medoff gets fine work from his actors — note Tom Arnold's amusing oiliness as a grandiloquent con man — and transcends obvious budgetary restraints to enhance pic with evocative period flavor and detail." Conversely, TV Guide said, "Because director Mark Medoff and screenwriter Douglas Sloan never quite get under the skin of Capote's quirky characters, especially the precocious Lily Jane, what should be a magically nostalgic tale seen through the eyes of a star-struck, small-town boy instead feels arch and brittle."

At WorldFest Houston, Children on Their Birthdays won the Platinum Award for Independent Theatrical Feature Films - Family/Children.
