= Children on Their Birthdays (short story) =

- Short story by Truman Capote
- Solo book form
- Country: United States
- Language: English
- Genre: Southern literature

Publication
- Publisher: Penguin (for image shown)
- Media type: Print
- Published in English: 1948
- Pages: 96 (for image shown)

"Children on Their Birthdays" is a short story written by Truman Capote, published serially in the late 1940s and appearing in A Tree of Night and Other Stories in 1949; it is noted as one of his better quality early short stories.

== Conception ==
Capote wrote "Children on Their Birthdays" in the summer of 1948 while traveling in Europe, from London to Paris, and on to Venice, where he worked alongside Donald Windham.

== Synopsis ==
The story is set in rural Alabama, where Miss Lily Jane Bobbit, a precocious 10-year-old girl, moves to town with her mother. The young girl is pretty and attracts the positive attention of the town boys, and the negative attentions of the town girls. The narrator's younger cousin Billy-Bob and his best friend Preacher fight for Miss Bobbit's affections. She befriends a black girl named Rosalba after the town boys bully her. She enters a talent show being put on by a con man and does a provocative and patriotic dance routine that everyone in the town loves. At the end, she gets the con man's money back for all the people in the town who were cheated out of it, and as she is setting off to leave and go to Hollywood to become a movie star, she gets run over by a bus.

== Characters ==
Miss Lily Jane Bobbit: the 10-year-old protagonist of the story who always goes by Miss Bobbit. Her character is said to be the inspiration for the young socialite Holly Golightly in Capote's novella Breakfast at Tiffany's. Truman Capote's aunt Marie Rudisill notes that both characters are "unattached, unconventional wanderers, dreamers in pursuit of some ideal of happiness."

Billy Bob: one of the local town boys who is lovesick for Miss Bobbit.

Aunt El: the narrator's aunt who is a model of traditional values in the community.

Manny Fox: a con artist.

== Critical reception and analysis ==
The short story has been described as resembling less complete writing by Eudora Welty.

It has been praised as "the jewel" of the collection A Tree of Night and Other Stories and is said to be a "perfect illustration of Capote's blending of Southern Folk writing with Jamesian classicism."

== Adaptations ==
As early as 1980, Capote's estranged friend Alan Schwartz asked for permission to sell a television script, which he had adapted with Capote's encouragement. Capote refused, saying he had written a television script himself.

In 2002, the short story was adapted to Children on Their Birthdays, an American independent film by director Mark Medoff. The screenplay written by Douglas Sloan.
