= Wilhelm Goetsch =

Johann Heinrich Wilhelm Goetsch (25 October 1887 – 20 March 1960) was a German zoologist and entomologist who was best known for several books on the ants. The most influential was Die Staaten der Ameisen (1937) which was revised in 1953 and translated into English.

== Life and work ==
Goetsch was born in Gotha where his father Johannes was a bookseller. His mother was Ella Wolfrum. He studied at the Ludwig-Maximilians-Universität München and at the Friedrich Wilhelm University of Berlin, and received a doctorate in 1914 with work on the formation of osteoderms in teleosts ("Über Hautknochenbildung bei Teleostiern und bei Amia calva"). He then worked as a zoological assistant at the University of Strasbourg, habilitating in 1917. His work was on freshwater Hydra lifespan and reproduction. He then moved to Munich in 1921. In 1929, he moved to South America and became a professor at the University of Santiago de Chile, holding the position until 1931. In 1934, he became a professor of zoology at the University of Breslau and held the position until the end of the war. After the war, he worked in Krumpendorf am Wörthersee, in Salzburg, and in Barcelona. In 1947, he became an honorary professor at the University of Graz.

Goetsch initially worked on Hydra but became interested in the social insects, particularly ants and termites. Among the experiments he conducted were feeding experiments on ants to see if the development of different ant castes was influenced by nutrition. His work on giant ants made him identify a so-called "active ingredient T" (or vitamin T) which he promoted as a medicine for children, it was later produced from Torula. In 1937, he wrote a major book on the ants Die Staaten der Ameisen (or The colonies of ants).

Goetsch's work inspired Carl Stephenson who wrote Leiningen Versus the Ants (1938, the German original in 1937) to produce a revised work after World War II called Marabunta in which Goetsch is introduced as a character who is an expert on the ants. Goetsch also produced a revised edition of his book on ants in 1953 which was translated into English. A notable changes was the change in the comparison of humans to ants. In the 1937 edition Goetsch considered ant society as an ideal that humans had yet to reach and ended the book with “in dem der eineschweigend verzichtet, der andere freudig opfert und gibt” (“some quietly renounce while others joyfully sacrifice and give”), a line that was taken from Adolf Hitler's Mein Kampf.

Goetsch was made a member of the Leopoldina academy in 1944. He died in Säckingen.
