= Carl Stephenson (writer) =

Austrian-born German author (1893–1983)

- Born: 3 November 1893; Vienna, Austria
- Died: 1983; Berlin, Germany
- Occupation: Author

Carl Stephenson (3 November 1893 – 31 December 1983) was an Austrian-born German writer, best known for his short story "Leiningen Versus the Ants".

== Biography ==
Stephenson was born in Vienna, Austria, in 1893.

Stephenson also wrote and published under the name Stefan Sorel.

Leiningen Versus the Ants was first published in 1938 and has since appeared in numerous collections of short stories. It was first adapted into a radio play in 1948, and later the screen as 1954's The Naked Jungle, directed by Byron Haskin, and starring Charlton Heston and Eleanor Parker.

== Death ==
Stephenson's death is sometimes incorrectly given as 1954, apparently due to confusion with the historian Carl Stephenson. However, works by, or edited by, Carl Stephenson were published in eight different years in the period from 1954 to 1967, indicating his death was almost certainly after 1954.
