= Cherry Wilson =

American novelist (1893–1976)

- Born: Rosemary Jeanne Burdick; July 12, 1893; Pennsylvania, USA
- Died: November 1976 (aged 83); Spokane, Washington, USA
- Occupation(s): Novelist, journalist
- Spouse: Robert Lee Wilson

Cherry Wilson (born Rosemary Jeanne Burdick, July 12, 1893 – November 1976) was an American novelist known for her work in the Western genre. Several of her books were turned into Hollywood films.

== Biography ==
Cherry was born in Pennsylvania, United States, to Frank Burdick and Anna Woodbury. After moving out west when she was 16, she began working in journalism; she had a column called "Cherry's Corner" that ran for more than 200 editions in The Journal Miner in Republic, Washington. She married Robert Wilson in the 1910s, and the pair was involved in homesteading, mining, taming wild mustangs.

She worked a lot of these experiences into the Western novels she began writing in the 1920s. She also wrote more than 100 short stories; most of these were published in the pulp magazine Western Story Magazine. Many of her books were turned into films (including several in the Buck Jones series), although Wilson said she had no part in their production. "I don't want to take credit for someone else's work," she told a reporter at The Arizona Daily Star. "Hollywood knows its requirements, and as far as my own experience goes, I must admit that the changes in my stories have usually been for the best from a movie standpoint."

== Selected works ==
- The Branded Sombrero (1927)
- Empty Saddles (1929)
- Stormy (1929)
- Black Wing's Rider (1934)
- Stirrup Brother (1935)
- Thunder Breaks (1936)
- Sandflow (1937)
