= Wife, Husband and Friend =

1939 film by Gregory Ratoff

- Opening titles
- Directed by: Gregory Ratoff
- Written by: Nunnally Johnson
- Based on: "Two Can Sing" by James M. Cain
- Produced by: Darryl F. Zanuck
- Starring: Loretta Young; Warner Baxter; Binnie Barnes; Cesar Romero; George Barbier
- Cinematography: Ernest Palmer
- Music by: Alfred Newman
- Production company: Twentieth Century Fox Film Corp.
- Release date: February 25, 1939
- Running time: 75 minutes
- Country: United States
- Language: English

Wife, Husband and Friend is a 1939 American comedy film directed by Gregory Ratoff and starring Loretta Young, Warner Baxter and Binnie Barnes in the three title roles, respectively. The film, based on a script by Nunnally Johnson, tells the story of a contractor and his wife, and how their musical ambitions result in marital tensions and a romantic triangle with a professional singer. The film was remade as Everybody Does It (1949), starring Paul Douglas as the contractor, Celeste Holm as his wife, and Linda Darnell as the singer.

== Plot ==
The opera season has opened in New York City, and building contractor Leonard Borland, who comes from a working-class background, is coping with the musical ambitions of his wife Doris, who is from a socially prominent family. Despite his misgivings that she has no talent, she is being trained for a career in singing by the voice teacher Hugo. Doris prepares for a recital that Leonard supports, hoping that will get singing "out of her system." The performance is witnessed by opera singer Cecil Carver, who is attracted to Leonard and believes that Doris lacks sufficient talent to become a pro. Cecil accidentally discovers that Leonard ironically does have a great operatic voice, and offers to train him.

Leonard goes along, egged on by Cecil, who believes that this will allow him to finally be on Doris' social level. While Doris' singing career flounders, Leonard's career as "Logan Bennett" meets with critical success in a tour with Cecil.

After returning to New York in preparation for a national tour, Leonard finds Doris has become ill because she was booed off the stage in her professional debut. He does not join Cecil on the tour. That night, Doris is confronted by Cecil at a party. Leonard claims innocence to adultery, and performs "On the Road to Mandalay" to prove his musical talent. Doris becomes despondent, and she and Leonard split up.

Leonard is cajoled by Cecil to perform the lead in an opera. But Leonard makes a fool of himself, and that leads to a reconciliation with Doris. Cecil is outraged and vows never to see him again. Leonard returns to the contracting business and gives up singing.

== Dubbing ==
Emery D'Arcy was the voice double for Warner Baxter, Nina Koshetz for Binnie Barnes and Tamara Shavrova for Loretta Young. None received screen credit.

== Production notes ==
Wife, Husband and Friend was one of the last films made by Loretta Young under contract with 20th-Century-Fox. She declined to sign again with Fox or any other studio, in the belief that this would put her at the mercy of studio bosses. Despite predictions that her career would be hurt, she subsequently won an Academy Award for The Farmer's Daughter (1947).

The working titles for this film were Women Are Dangerous and Career in C Major.

Myrna Loy was originally cast in the role eventually played by Loretta Young, with Lionel Atwill considered for the part of Hertz, Ed Brophy for the part of Jaffe, and Eily Malyon for the part of Mrs. Craig. The story was performed by the Lux Radio Theatre on April 28, 1941, starring George Brent, Priscilla Lane and Gail Patrick.

James M. Cain, noted mainly for his mystery novels, was paid $8,000 for the film rights to his story "Two Can Sing".
