= Everybody Does It =

1949 film by Edmund Goulding

- Theatrical release poster
- Directed by: Edmund Goulding
- Screenplay by: Nunnally Johnson
- Story by: James M. Cain
- Produced by: Nunnally Johnson
- Starring: Paul Douglas; Linda Darnell; Celeste Holm
- Cinematography: Joseph LaShelle
- Edited by: Robert Fritch
- Music by: Alfred Newman
- Production company: 20th Century Fox
- Distributed by: 20th Century Fox
- Release date: October 25, 1949
- Running time: 98 minutes
- Country: United States
- Language: English
- Box office: $1.6 million (US rentals)

Everybody Does It is a 1949 American comedy film directed by Edmund Goulding and starring Paul Douglas, Linda Darnell and Celeste Holm. In the film, a businessman's wife tries to become an opera star, failing miserably due to her lack of talent. When it turns out that her totally untrained husband is found to have a marvelous singing voice and goes on tour under an assumed name, his wife is livid.

Neither Douglas nor Darnell were known for their singing, but Darnell convincingly lip syncs long stretches of an imaginary opera, L'Amore di Fatima. According to a poster, the music for it was written by Mario Castelnuovo-Tedesco. In a little tongue-in-cheek detail, the poster lists Tedesco – who wrote real operas — as the composer. To add to the illusion of the opera's authenticity, Douglas also mouths the words to some known songs, including a musical setting of the Rudyard Kipling poem Mandalay and the Toreador Song from Carmen. The operatic scenes were staged by Vladimir Rosing.

The film is a word-for-word remake of 1939's Wife, Husband and Friend, which starred Warner Baxter as Borland, Loretta Young as his wife, and Binnie Barnes as Cecil Carver.

== Plot ==
Leonard Borland, a New York City wrecking contractor, is married to socialite Doris, an aspiring opera singer. Though she lacks the talent to be a true singing star, Borland finances her recital to the tune of $3,000. Meanwhile, opera celebrity Cecil Carver complains there are no suitable baritones for her new production. By chance, she first encounters Borland as he unsuccessfully tries to coax an important critic to attend his wife's performance. Although he refuses, Cecil's curiosity is roused. After attending the recital, she phones Borland at his office and invites Leonard to her apartment to share her opinion. The two discover a certain affinity, but Borland's in love with his wife. Then, Cecil accidentally discovers Leonard, unlike his wife, has a powerful voice. She assigns him to her production under the name "Logan Bennett". Doris is too busy training with her mother and vocal coach to note what her husband is up to. She believes he is on the road, stirring up business for his wrecking crews.

While on tour, Cecil attempts to seduce him, but Leonard, still much in love with Doris, rejects her. Back in New York, Leonard learns that Doris is now under medical care for shock treatment, caused by a disastrous booking at a movie palace. Even though she decides to give up her musical aspirations, she agrees to guest a cocktail party for celebrities. Noticing Leonard's uncomfortable reaction to Cecil's presence at the party, Doris realizes that she might be her husband's mistress. Cecil is disappointed that Leonard pretends not to know her and assures Doris that she is not attracted to him whatsoever, and only knows him through the opera. The audience, dumbfounded by the revelation that Leonard is an opera singer, demands that he perform at the party.

Humiliated by his betrayal, Doris orders Leonard to leave her. A few days later, Leonard resides penniless in a hotel and finds out that Doris currently lives in Palm Beach. Due to financial troubles, Leonard accepts a steady opera job. At his debut, attended by Doris and her parents, he is surprised by sudden stage fright. An irritated Cecil and her assistant give him some pills and a potion, causing him to feel sick, and fall from the stage before the entire audience. Much to the audience's amusement, he misses his cue and wrecks the entire production. He ends his embarrassing performance by falling into the orchestra pit, prompting a livid Cecil to order him to leave. Doris, feeling for her estranged husband, rushes backstage to reconcile with him. Returning home, they find out that Leonard has been offered a lucrative wrecking contract in Texas.

== Cast ==
- Paul Douglas as Leonard Borland (aka Logan Bennett)
- Linda Darnell as Cecil Carver
- Celeste Holm as Doris Borland
- Charles Coburn as Major Blair
- Millard Mitchell as Mike Craig
- Lucile Watson as Mrs. Blair
- John Hoyt as Wilkins
- Leon Belasco as Professor Hugo
- George Tobias as Rossi

== Music ==
- Original music by Alfred Newman and Mario Castelnuovo-Tedesco
- Music by Richard A. Whiting and Frank Harling
- Lyrics by Leo Robin
- Songs performed by New York City Opera baritone Stephen Kemalyan, who dubbed for Paul Douglas
- Songs performed by San Francisco Opera soprano Helen Spann, who dubbed for Linda Darnell

== Reception ==
Bosley Crowther, critic for The New York Times, praised Douglas's "robust comedic talent" and wrote that "Mr. Douglas, given his head and a very fat part on which to use it, turns in a highly funny job." He also commended the rest of the cast of the "glib and gleesome farce."
