= Montgomery Street =

Street in San Francisco, United States

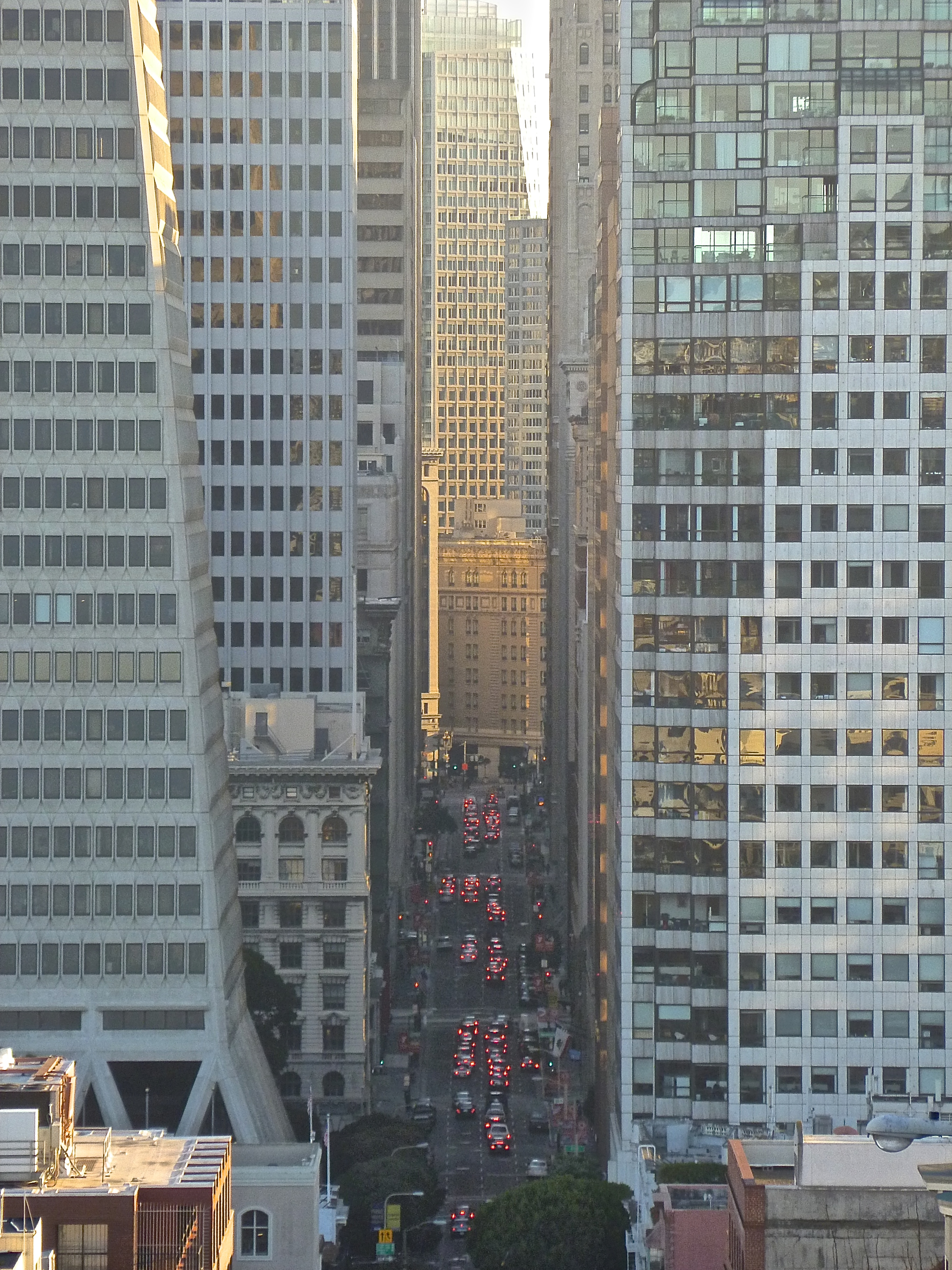
- Looking south down Montgomery Street from Telegraph Hill through the Financial District
- Interactive map of Montgomery Street
- Namesake: John B. Montgomery
- Length: 1.0 mi (1.6 km)
- Location: San Francisco
- Coordinates: 37°47′43″N 122°24′11″W
- North end: Telegraph Hill
- South end: Market Street

Montgomery Street is a north-south thoroughfare in San Francisco, California, in the United States. It runs about 16 blocks from the residential Telegraph Hill neighborhood south through downtown, terminating at Market Street. South of Columbus Avenue and Washington Street, Montgomery Street runs through the heart of San Francisco's Financial District and contains one of the highest concentrations of financial activity, investment business, and venture capital in the United States and the world. For this reason, it is known as "the Wall Street of the West". The stretch of Montgomery from Washington Street to Market Street consists mainly of high-rise office buildings, the best known being the Transamerica Pyramid, which was the tallest building in San Francisco from 1972 until 2018. South of Market Street, the street continues as New Montgomery Street for two more blocks to terminate at Howard Street in the SOMA district. On Telegraph Hill, the street's main section ends near Julius' Castle, with a separate segment resuming one block to the north, running from Lombard Street to Francisco Street.

== History ==
Before the California Gold Rush, the land which is now Montgomery Street lay at the edge of San Francisco Bay, running along the anchorage of Yerba Buena Cove. In his book Days of the Dons, Steven Richardson (son of early San Francisco settler William Anthony Richardson) recalled in the late 1830s watching "good-sized" fishes and "bears, wolves, and coyotes quarreling over their prey along what is now Montgomery Street".

Montgomery Street had its beginnings as an unnamed street running along the shoreline in what was then the Mexican pueblo of Yerba Buena. On July 9, 1846, following the Bear Flag Revolt, a detachment from the USS Portsmouth, commanded by Captain John B. Montgomery, landed near what was later the intersection of Montgomery and Clay Streets and raised the American flag at the nearby plaza of Yerba Buena (now Portsmouth Square). When the newly-renamed American city of San Francisco was platted by Benjamin R. Buckelew and Jasper O'Farrell in 1847, the street was given the name Montgomery Street in his honor.

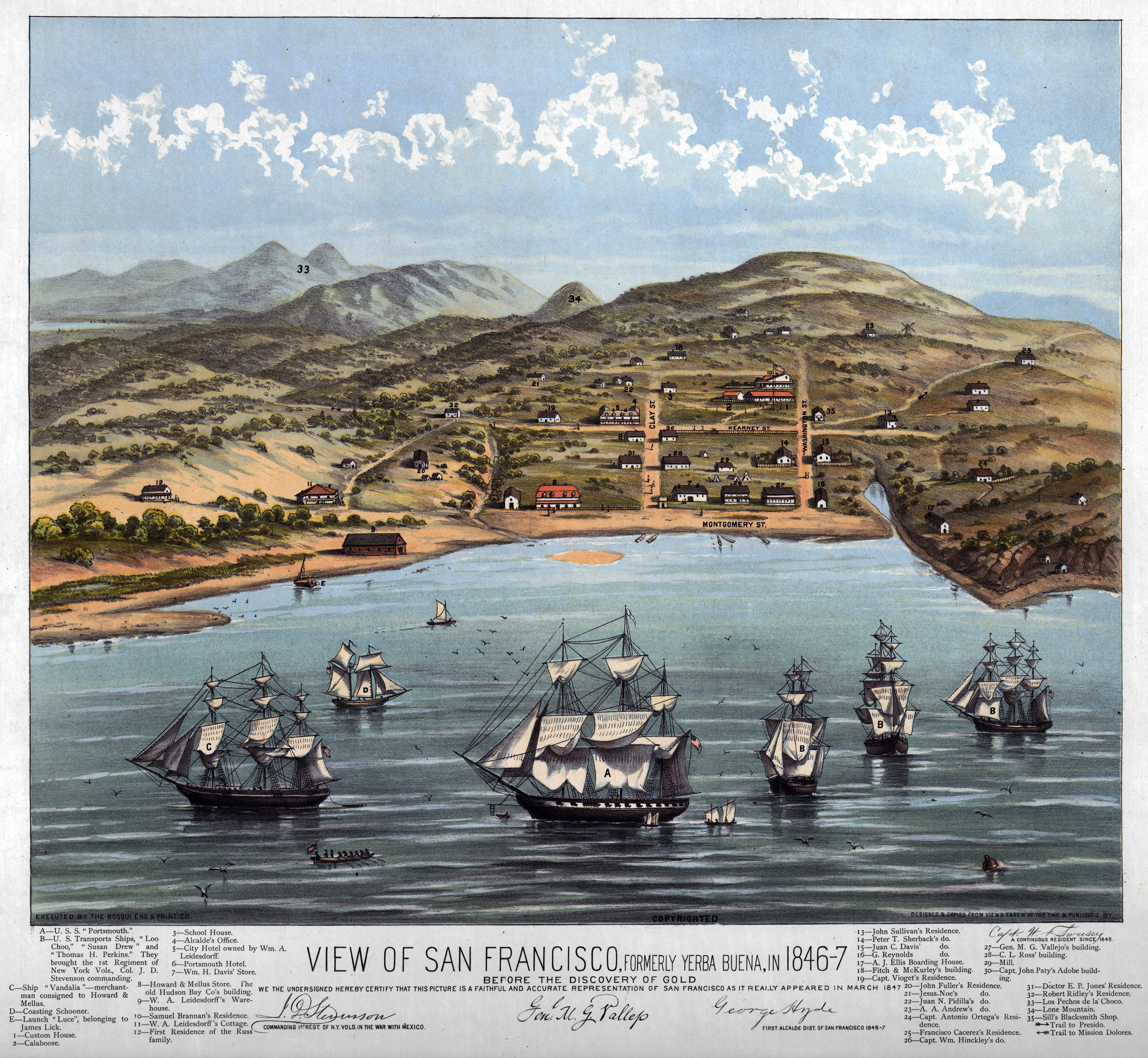
View of San Francisco following the 1846 American conquest of California, showing Montgomery Street as the location of the shoreline of Yerba Buena Cove. Print by Edward Bosqui Company, ca. 1884.

Intense land speculation during the Gold Rush created a demand for more usable land in the rapidly growing city, and sandy bluffs near the waterfront were leveled and the shallows filled with sand (and the ruins of many ships) to make new building lots. Between 1849 and 1852, the waterfront advanced about four blocks. At present, Montgomery Street is about seven blocks from the water. In 1853 the Montgomery Block, a center of early San Francisco law and literature, was built at 600 Montgomery, on land currently occupied by the Transamerica Pyramid.

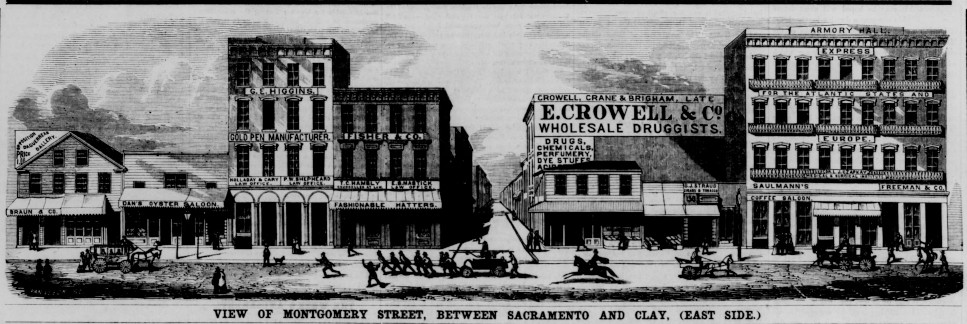
Etching of Montgomery Street in 1857

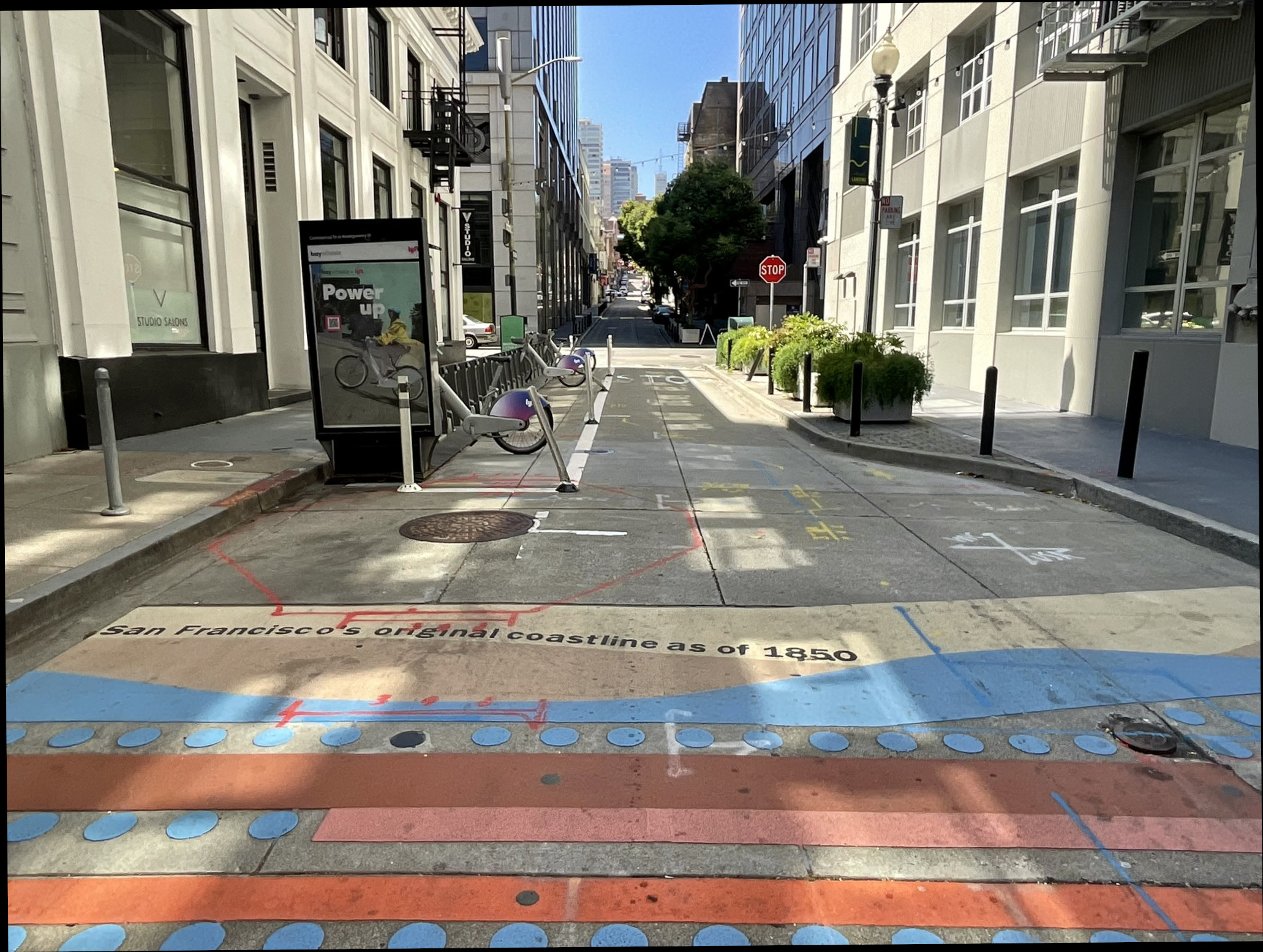
Commercial St looking west to Montgomery Street, with commemoration of historical San Francisco Bay shoreline.

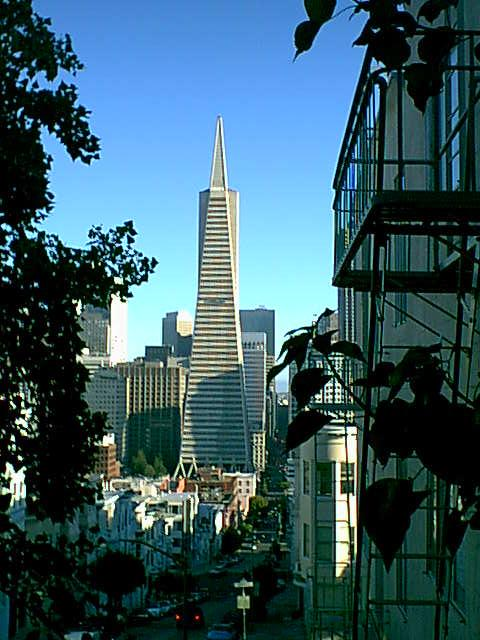
Transamerica Pyramid from upper Montgomery Street on Telegraph Hill.

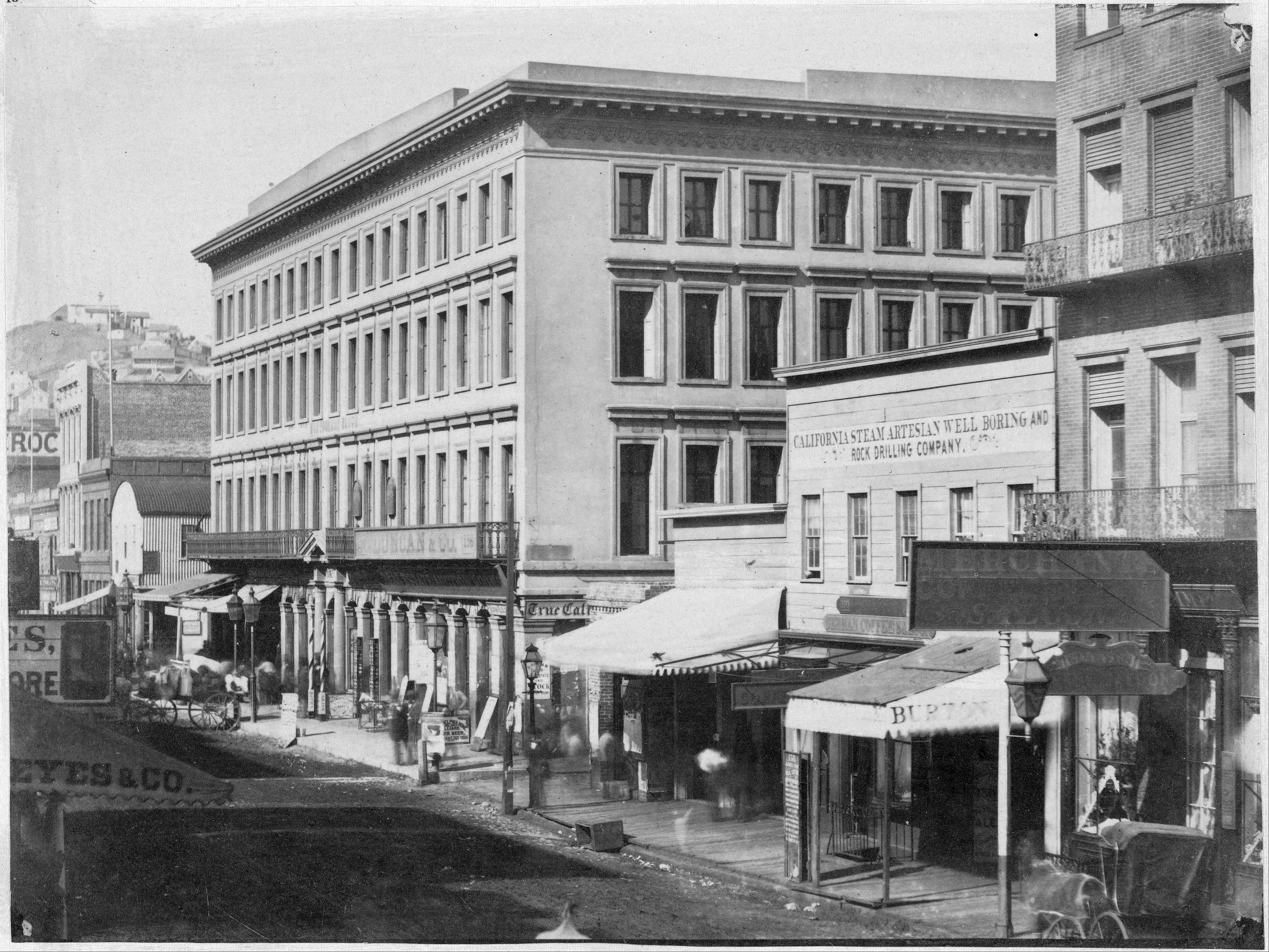
Montgomery Block, 1862.

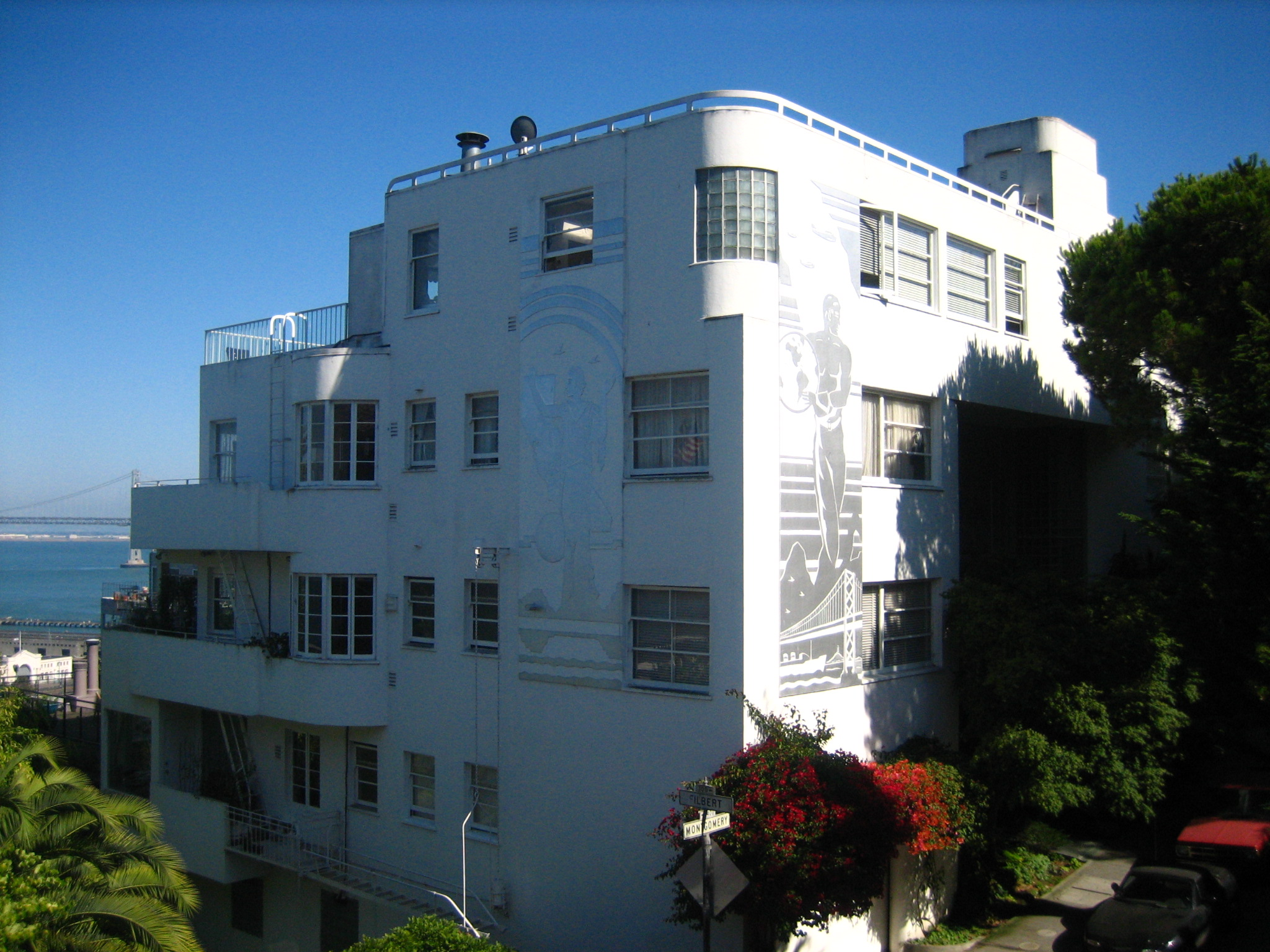
Malloch Building, intersection of Montgomery St and Filbert Steps, Telegraph Hill.

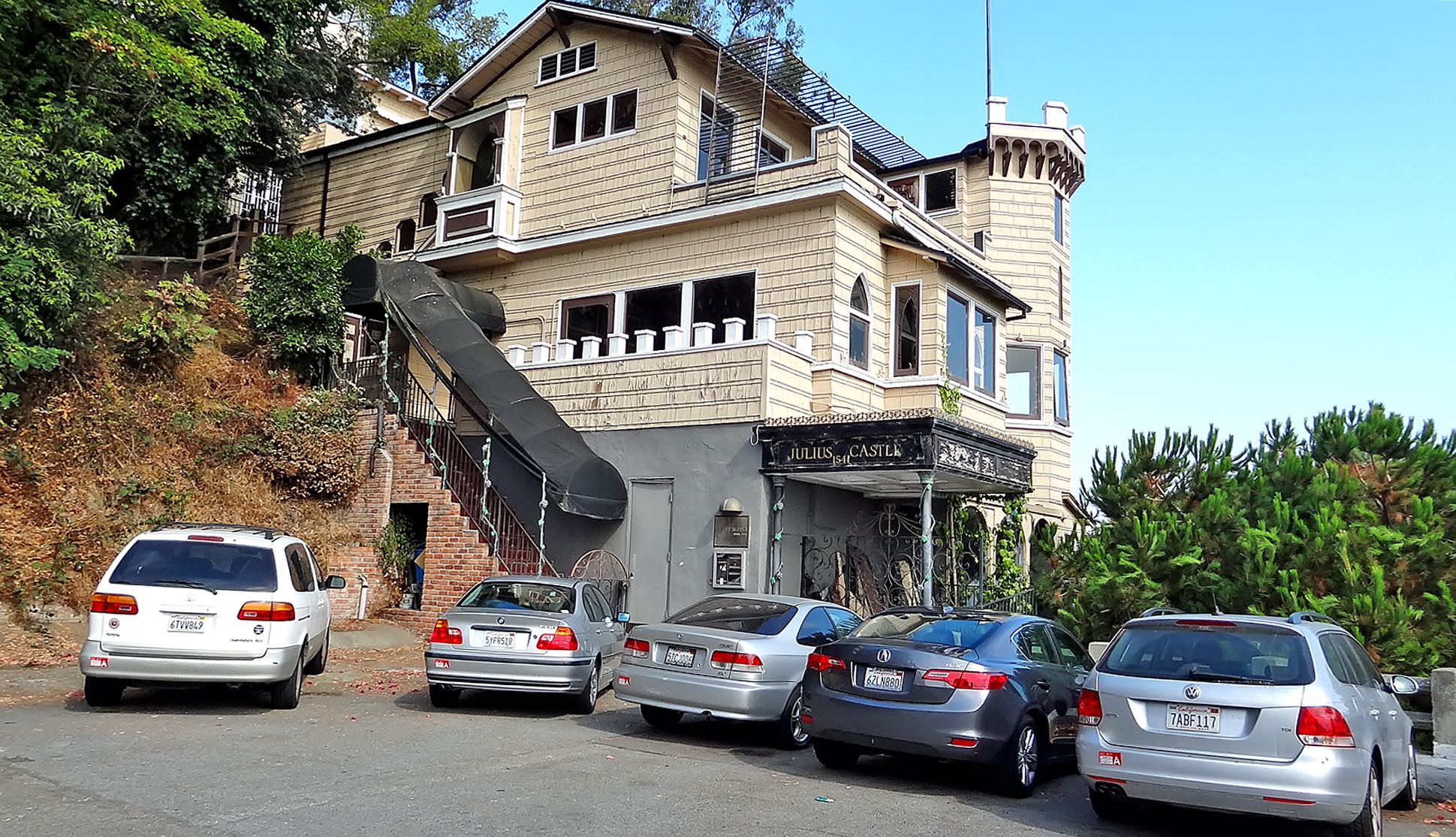
Julius' Castle, Telegraph Hill.

== Offices ==
Many banks and financial-services companies have had offices in the buildings on or near Montgomery Street, especially between Market Street and Sacramento Street:

- The world headquarters of Wells Fargo are at 420 Montgomery.
- 555 California Street, between Kearny and Montgomery, served as Bank of America's world headquarters prior to its merger with NationsBank and was (from 1969 to 2005) officially called the Bank of America Building.
- The Transamerica Pyramid (600 Montgomery, at Columbus Avenue) was the headquarters of Transamerica Corporation and still appears in the company's logo.
- Melvin Belli, lawyer known as "The King of Torts", had his offices at the Belli Building at 722–724 Montgomery St. and the Genella Building at 726–728 Montgomery St. Belli used to raise a Jolly Roger and fire a cannon every time he won a case.
- Bank of the West is headquartered at 180 Montgomery Street.
- Hong Kong Economic and Trade Office, San Francisco, at 130 Montgomery Street.

== Notable buildings ==
High-rises and other notable buildings along Montgomery Street:

=== Financial District ===
- 44 Montgomery
- Hunter-Dulin Building (111 Sutter St at Montgomery)
- 100 Montgomery Street
- 101 Montgomery
- 180 Montgomery Street
- Mills Building and Tower (at Montgomery St and Bush)
- Russ Building (235 Montgomery St)
- Commercial Union Assurance Building (315 Montgomery St)
- Omni San Francisco Hotel
- Borel & Co. (440 Montgomery St)
- 456 Montgomery Plaza
- Italian American Bank (460 Montgomery St)
- 505 Montgomery Street
- Transamerica Pyramid (600 Montgomery St)
- Columbia Savings Bank Building (700 Montgomery St)
- Golden Era Building (at 732-734 Montgomery St)

A building bearing the name of One Montgomery Tower is located one block away from Montgomery Street at the intersection of Post and Kearny streets, behind the Wells Fargo flagship branch and Crocker Galleria.

=== Telegraph Hill ===
- Malloch Building (1360 Montgomery St)
- Julius' Castle (1541 Montgomery St)

== Monuments ==
The Admission Day Monument at the intersection of Montgomery Street and Market Street commemorates California Admission Day (September 9, 1850), the date on which the state became part of the Union, following the Mexican–American War of 1848.

== Public transit ==
Montgomery Street is served by the BART and Muni Metro Montgomery Street Station.

== See also ==
- Ernie's (former restaurant on Montgomery Street near Jackson Square)
- Consulate General of Israel to the Pacific Northwest Region (456 Montgomery St)
- Occidental Hotel (former hotel at Montgomery and Bush, destroyed in the 1906 earthquake)
