= Borel & Co. =

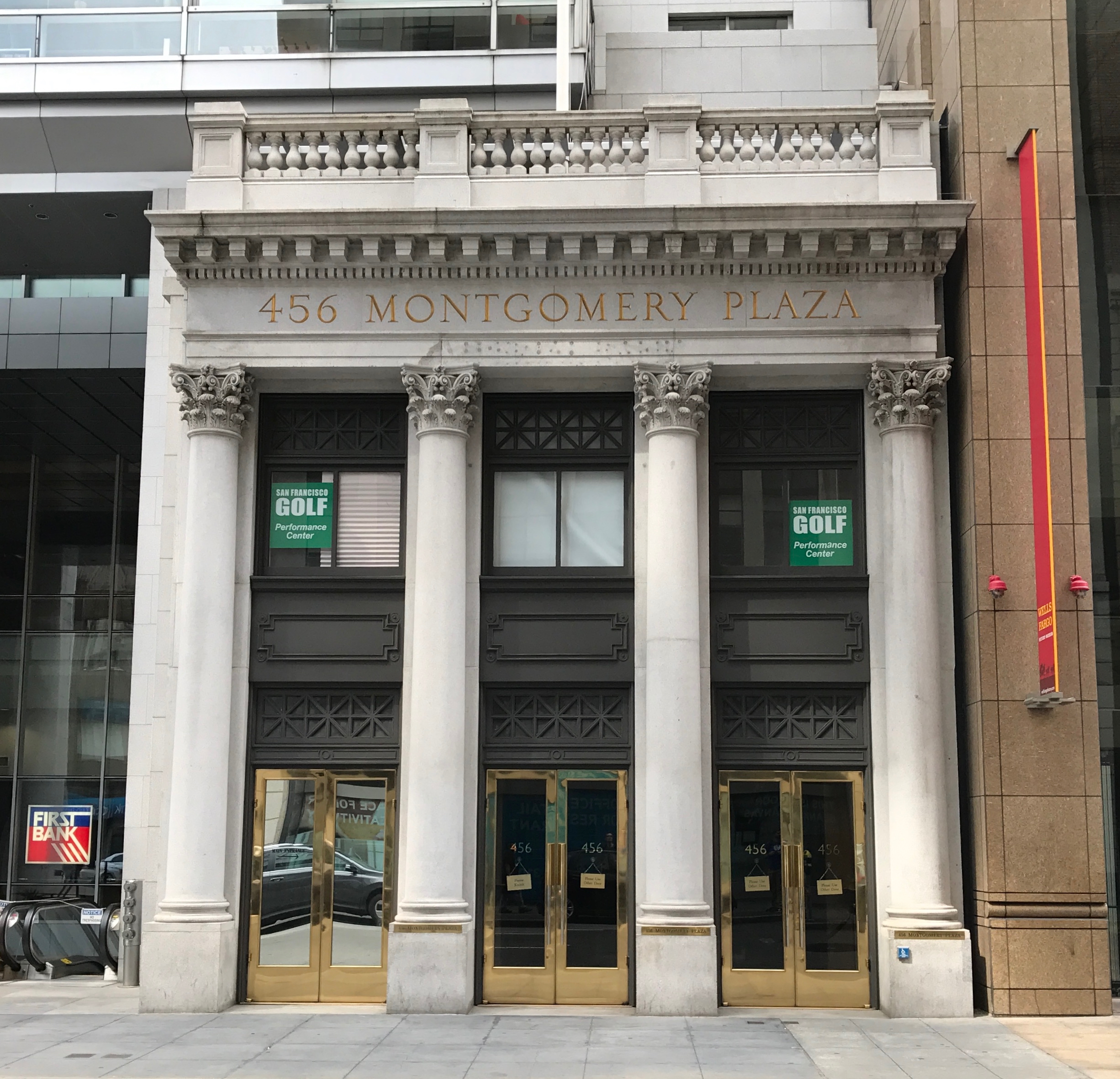
- Building in 2017

- Location within San Francisco County Location within California Location within the United States
- 37.793505°N 122.402759°W
- Location: 440 Montgomery Street, San Francisco, California, U.S.

History
- Built: 1908
- Rebuilt: Roger Owen Boyer and Associates

Site notes
- Architect: Albert Pissis
- Architectural style: Beaux Arts

San Francisco Designated Landmark
- Designated: April 6, 1980
- Reference no.: 109

The Borel & Co. building is a historic building built in 1908 and located at 440 Montgomery Street in San Francisco, California. The building is a small, two story, granite-faced, steel frame building.

The Borel & Co. Building has been listed as a San Francisco Designated Landmark (number 109) since April 6, 1980.

== History ==
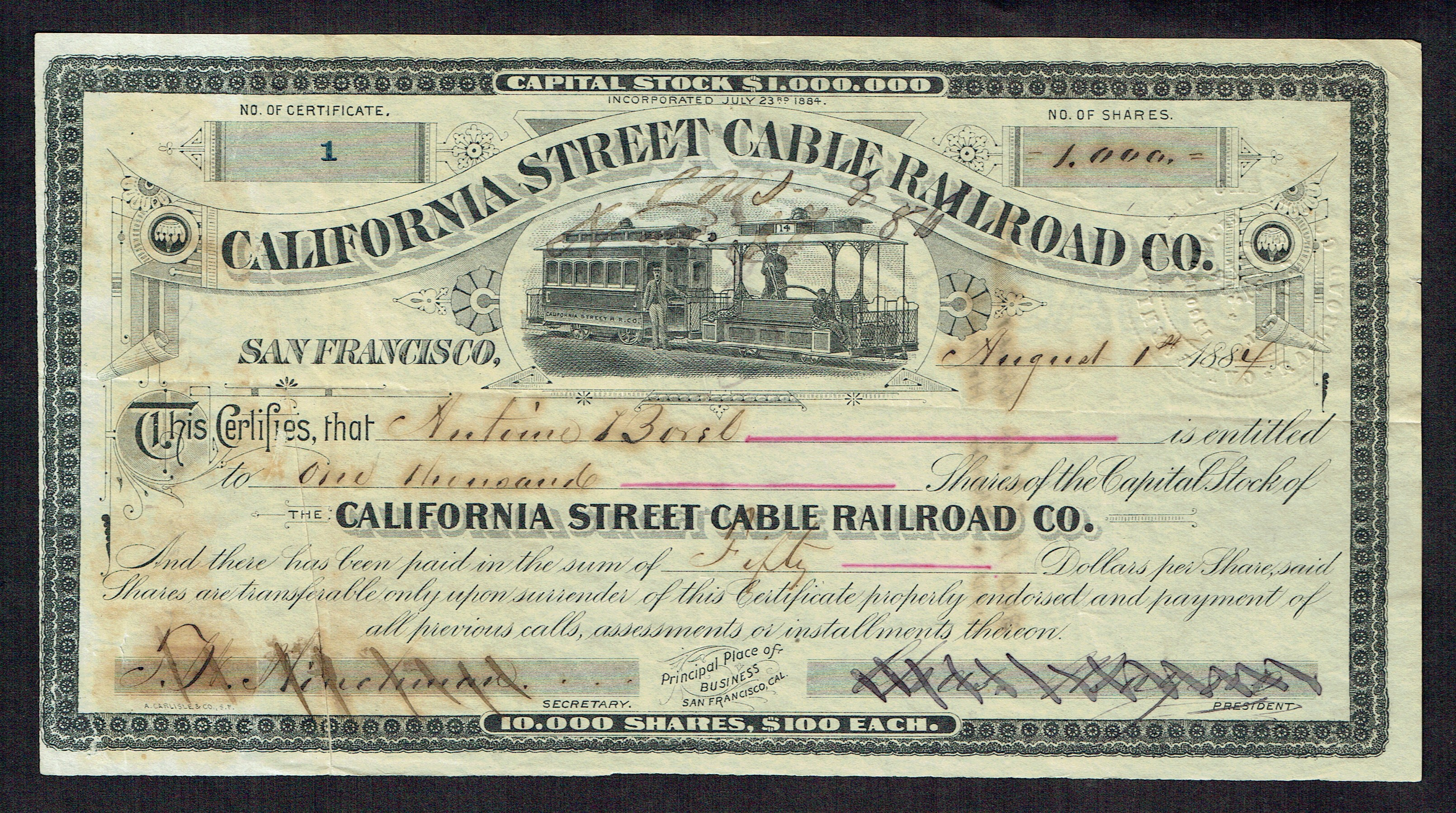
Antoine Borel was the owner of this share of the California Street Cable Railroad Co., issued 1. August 1884

The Borel Company Building was commissioned by Swiss-born banker and diplomat, Antoine Borel. Although the Borel Company was generally thought of as a commercial bank, the type of service offered was more closely related to investment services. Borel held directorates in the California-Oregon Power Company, the Los Angeles Railroad, The Spring Valley Water Company, and the Bank of California. In 1884, Borel organized a syndicate to purchase the California Street Cable Car line which had been in operation since 1878. It was largely through Borel's efforts that the company expanded its operations by constructing the Hyde Street Line.

The building was subject to facadism by architectural firm Roger Owen Boyer and Associates, and it was combined with the neighboring Italian American Bank (1907), in order to create 456 Montgomery Plaza.

== Design ==
The building was designed by Albert Pissis, It exemplifies the Beaux Arts architecture commercial classicism strongly evident in the reconstruction of downtown San Francisco following the 1906 earthquake and fire.

The Corinthian façade begins the colonnaded parade of temple banks that runs northward from Montgomery Street to Columbus Avenue. The building is only 27.5 feet wide, and while this narrow façade offered less opportunity for innovation than would a larger street frontage, it demanded greater innovation to achieve architectural excellence.
