= The House on Telegraph Hill =

1951 film by Robert Wise

House on Telegraph Hill
- Theatrical release poster
- Directed by: Robert Wise
- Screenplay by: Elick Moll; Frank Partos
- Based on: The Frightened Child; 1948 novel by Dana Lyon
- Produced by: Robert Bassler
- Starring: Richard Basehart; Valentina Cortese; William Lundigan; Fay Baker
- Cinematography: Lucien Ballard
- Edited by: Nick DeMaggio
- Music by: Sol Kaplan
- Distributed by: Twentieth Century-Fox
- Release date: May 12, 1951 (New York)
- Running time: 93 minutes
- Country: United States
- Language: English

The House on Telegraph Hill is a 1951 American film noir thriller directed by Robert Wise and starring Richard Basehart, Valentina Cortese and William Lundigan. The film received an Academy Award nomination for its art direction. Telegraph Hill is a dominant hill overlooking the water in northeast San Francisco.

== Plot ==
Polish Viktoria Kowalska lost her home and her husband in the German occupation of Poland and is imprisoned in the Bergen-Belsen concentration camp. She befriends another prisoner, Karin Dernakova, who dreams of reuniting with her young son, Christopher, sent to live in San Francisco with a wealthy aunt.

Karin dies shortly before the camp is liberated. Seeking a better life, Viktoria uses Karin's papers to assume her identity, destroying her own papers. When the camp is liberated by the Allies, Viktoria is interviewed by Major Marc Bennett, who secures a place for her in a displaced persons camp. As Karin, Viktoria writes to Karin's aunt Sophia in San Francisco, but receives a cable from lawyers that Sophia has died.

Four years later, still using Karin's name, Viktoria travels to New York City, where she meets Chris's guardian, Alan Spender, Sophia's distant relative. Viktoria wishes to raise Karin's son, but he and Sophia's fortune are in Alan's hands until Chris comes of age. Realizing Alan is attracted to her and that it will be easier to stay in the country with an American husband, she allows Alan to romance her, and they soon marry. Alan takes "Karin" to San Francisco, where he, Chris, and Chris' governess, Margaret, live in Aunt Sophia's ornate Victorian mansion on Telegraph Hill. Tensions mount between Karin and Margaret, who has raised Chris, has been Alan's lover, and resents Karin.

Karin is alarmed at a dangerously damaged playhouse overlooking the hill that Chris claims he damaged with an explosion from his toy chemistry set. He and Margaret beg her not to tell Alan; Karin is perplexed when Alan reveals he already knows. As Karin investigates the playhouse, she is startled by Alan, nearly falling to her death through a hole in the floor. Alan rescues her and is alarmed by her startled behavior.

At a party, Karin is pleased to meet Marc Bennett again, who clearly remembers her; he was Alan's schoolmate and is a partner at the law firm handling Sophia's affairs. They are attracted to each other, but she keeps a respectful distance.

The brakes on Karin's car fail on a day when Chris was supposed to be with her, the car careening onto its side. She escapes unharmed but contacts Marc, telling him that she believes Alan sabotaged the car to kill them both and inherit Sophia's money.

Following up, Karin goes to Marc's office, but Alan encounters her in the lobby and grows suspicious when she pretends to have mistaken her dentist's address. Marc calls to check up on her, inviting the couple to dinner that night. Alan confidentially expresses concern to Marc about Karin's paranoid behavior, and Marc privately reports to Karin that the mechanic's and chemist's reports on the car were inconclusive. She reveals her true identity to Marc, who does not blame a concentration camp survivor for wanting a better life. He tells Karin that he is in love with her.

Karin discovers Sophia's obituary, indicating that the cable to her was sent three days before Sophia's death—proof that Alan sent the cable before killing Sophia. Her attempt to phone Marc is thwarted when Alan does not leave her alone for the entire evening.

Alan brings her orange juice; sure her glass has been poisoned, when he briefly leaves the room, she switches her glass with his. She attempts to call the police, but Alan left the phone off the hook in another room. Seeing her drink the orange juice, Alan confesses that he murdered Sophia and that he has mixed an overdose of sedatives into her drink. Karin informs him that he has poisoned himself. She tries to telephone a doctor, but the phone is still off the hook. Margaret is attracted by the commotion, and Alan begs her to phone a doctor. Realizing that he does not love her and he will never stop trying to kill Chris, Margaret watches as Alan dies. Meanwhile, Karin locates Chris to ensure he is safe. Having repeatedly been unable to reach Karin, Marc arrives to help.

Margaret is arrested for refusing to aid Alan. Karin leaves the house with Marc and Chris to begin a new life.

== Cast ==
- Richard Basehart as Alan Spender
- Valentina Cortese (Valentina Cortesa, in the opening credits) as Viktoria Kowalska
- William Lundigan as Major Marc Bennett
- Fay Baker as Margaret
- Gordon Gebert as Christopher
- Steven Geray as Dr. Burkhardt
- Herb Butterfield as Joseph C. Callahan
- John Burton as Mr. Whitmore
- Katherine Meskill as Mrs. Whitmore
- Mario Siletti as Tony, the Grocer
- Charles Wagenheim as Man at Accident
- David Clarke as Mechanic
- Tamara Schee as Maria
- Natasha Lytess as Karin Dernakova

== Production ==
Parts of the film, including the runaway car scene, were shot on location in the Telegraph Hill area of San Francisco. Long shots of the exterior of the mansion were a combination of matte paintings and studio-created facades that were erected in front of the house at 1541 Montgomery Street. This was the location of the longtime Telegraph Hill restaurant Julius' Castle, which closed in 2008 after operating for 84 years. Closer shots of the exterior entrance and driveway were filmed on a studio lot, and scenes for the garden and backyard were filmed on the lawn of Coit Tower. The corner market seen in the film was Speedy's New Union Grocery at 301 Union at the corner of Montgomery, which closed in 2008 after 93 years in business. Marc Bennett's office building was the Crocker flatiron building located at One Post Street, which was demolished in 1969 and replaced by the skyscraper now known as McKesson Plaza.

== Reception ==
In a contemporary review for The New York Times, critic Thomas M. Pryor called the film "a suspense-laden drama" that "spins an effective tale of evil intent that adds up to good entertainment."

== Awards ==
The film was nominated for the Academy Award for Best Art Direction.
