= Antoine Borel =

Swiss-born American banker (1840–1915)

- Born: December 29, 1840; Neuchâtel, Switzerland
- Died: March 26, 1915 (aged 74); Lausanne, Switzerland
- Citizenship: American and Swiss
- Occupations: Banker, director
- Known for: Ran the San-Francisco based commercial bank Borel & Co.
- Spouse: Grace Canitrot (m. 1871)
- Children: 7

Antoine Borel (December 29, 1840 – March 26, 1915) was a Swiss-American banker who ran the eponymous Borel & Co., headquartered in San Francisco, California.

He was born in Neuchâtel, Switzerland and emigrated to the United States in 1862, where he joined his brother's bank and served as a Swiss consul and director for several companies, including the Spring Valley Water Company, the California Street Cable Company, and the Bankers' Investment Company. He died following an operation in Switzerland, to where he had returned in July 1914 for health issues.

== Early life ==
Borel was born in Neuchâtel, Switzerland, to a wealthy merchant family, and completed his education in Switzerland and Germany. He emigrated to San Francisco, arriving in 1862, following his brother Alfred, who had arrived in 1855.

== Career ==
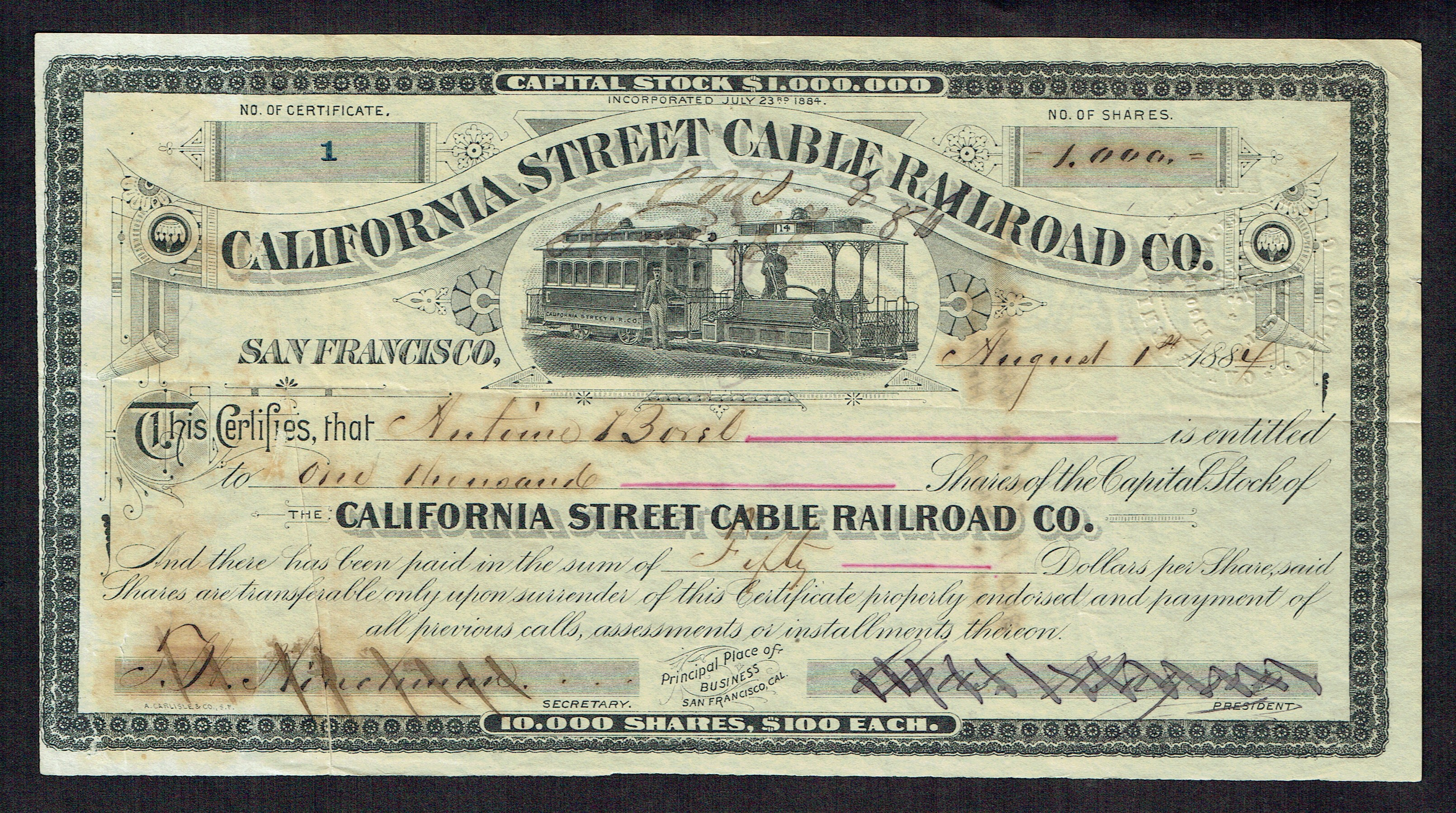
California Street Cable Railroad Company stock certificate #1, showing Borel owned 1,000 shares

Alfred Borel founded Borel & Co. in 1852; Antoine joined him in 1862, and the business was turned over to Antoine when Alfred returned to Europe in 1898. Antoine was appointed the vice-consul of Switzerland to California and Nevada when he was 21, ascending to consul-general in 1885, a position he held until 1913. During this period, Antoine also served on the board of several companies, including the Spring Valley Water Company, the California Street Cable Company, the Wells Fargo Express Company, and the Bank of California Company.

Borel was a prominent philanthropist in San Mateo, California, where he had established a summer home in 1874 on the advice of their family's doctors. After a fire in 1883 which destroyed the city's public library, Borel donated land for a new library building, which subsequently was destroyed in another fire in 1887. Borel also built a chapel on the edge of his property, later known as Geneva or Grace Chapel, in 1892; it later was turned over to Saint Matthews Episcopal Church in 1902, and then to the Hillbarn Theatre, a community theater organization, in 1937.

== Personal life ==
Antoine Borel and his wife, Grace (née Canitrot, 1849–1923), were married in 1871 and had seven children, six of which were living at the time of his death: five daughters and one son.

Borel's children and [their spouses]:

- Chonita S. "Nita" Borel (1872–1958)
- Sophie Grace Borel (1874–1953) [John Mellgren Lewis (1907)], [Aylett R. Cotton, Jr. (1937)]
- Grace Eleanor Borel (1876–1958) [Louis A. Bovet (1901)]
- Alice Borel (1877–1936) [Aylett R. Cotton, Jr. (1907)]
- Antoine Alfred Borel, Jr. (1879–1958) [Mary Elizabeth "Mardie" McMahon (1909)]
- Alfred August Borel (1880–1884)
- Guadalupe Henriette "Lupita" Borel (1882–1949)

Borel died on March 26, 1915, in Lausanne, Switzerland, following an intestinal operation. He had returned to Switzerland in July 1914 with members of his family for health reasons, and took up residence there after being stranded by World War I.

== Legacy ==
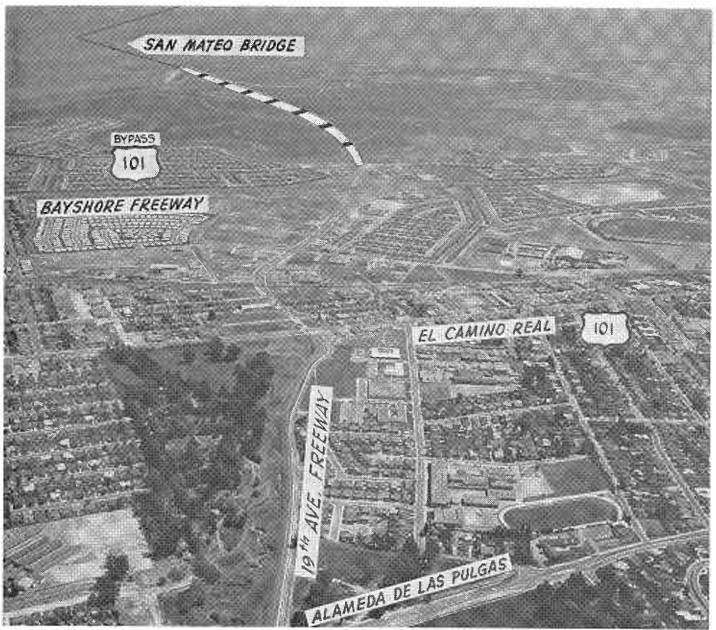
View directed east c. 1962, showing SR 92 under construction; the Borel family estate was the wooded area north (left) of the new freeway

Borel acquired the 300-acre (120 ha) "Homestead Estate" site in 1874 for US$25,000 (equivalent to $710,000 in 2025) from the estate of François L. A. Pioche, who also was a prominent San Francisco banker. That site was west of El Camino Real near present-day SR 92 in San Mateo; Antoine Borel used it as his summer residence. In 1897, Borel purchased the Château de Gorgier in Switzerland for his visits to that country. It was restored between 1897 and 1905, and after his death, remained with the Borel family until it was sold in 2001.

After Antoine Borel's death, the San Mateo estate became the year-round home for the Borel family, including San Mateo County Superior Court Judge Aylett R. Cotton Jr., son of Aylett R. Cotton; the younger Cotton had married two of Borel's daughters. Portions of the estate were sold off in the 1920s, forming new residential subdivisions south of the original city limits. The mansion on the Homestead site was started in 1868 by Sidney V. Pringle, then sold to Pioche, who remodeled it before it was acquired by Borel with the estate. It was destroyed in a fire on June 8, 1962; at that time, it already had been scheduled for demolition.

The center section of the estate was designated for the construction of SR 92 in 1961, and the Borel family won settlements totaling more than US$1 million, and the family decided to develop the remaining land, dividing it between the Bovets, who took the eastern portion, and the Cottons, who took the western. A proposal to retain the remaining buildings and gardens as a park was dismissed and they were removed relatively quickly.

The Bovet-Borel family formed the Borel Estate Company in the 1960s to sell off and manage suburban development of the family's extensive and now extremely valuable real estate holdings. The Borel Place office development was started in the 1960s on the former Homestead site, after the completion of SR 92. The estate's small chapel had a 300 lb (140 kg) brass bell gifted in 1908 from Antoine Borel; when the chapel was torn down in December 1961 to make way for SR 92, the bell moved with the chapel's owners, Hillbarn Theatre, to Foster City.

In the 1970s, Gilbert Bovet, Miller Ream, and other Bovet-Borel heirs would spin off several other companies from Borel Estate Company to reinvest family funds, including Borel Development Corporation and Borel Restaurant Corporation. Borel Restaurants had an especially high profile, opening Borel's, a large flagship restaurant, on a portion of the former estate that had been developed as office parks, and a national chain of restaurants that did business under the name Rusty Scupper. Borel Restaurants was sold in 1975, becoming a subsidiary of Stouffer Corporation, though members of the Bovet-Borel family would continue to act as executives for the company following the sale.

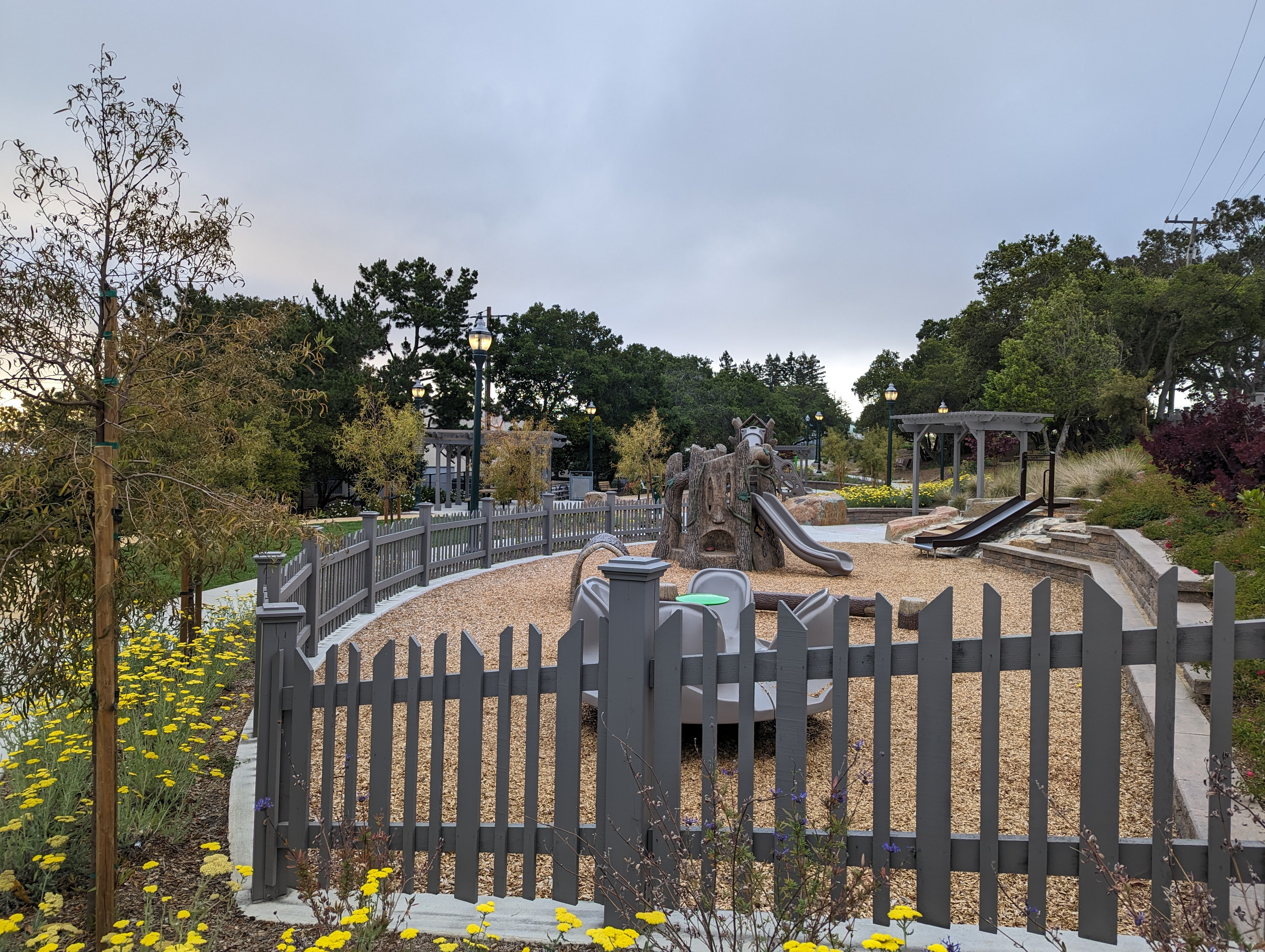
Borel Park in San Mateo

The Borel Bank & Trust Company was founded by Harold and Ronald Fick in 1979; they are great-grandsons of Antoine Borel, and the bank was headquartered on the former Borel estate in San Mateo. Borel Bank & Trust was acquired by Boston Private Financial Holdings in 2001, changing its name to Boston Private Bank & Trust in September 2012. Boston Private in turn was acquired by SVB Financial Group in 2021, then auctioned in 2023 following the collapse of Silicon Valley Bank.

A middle school and small neighborhood park, remodeled in 2022, on the Homestead site also are named for Borel.
