= Nandita Bakhshi =

Indian-born banking executive

- Education: University of Calcutta (BA); Jadavpur University (MA)
- Occupation: Banking executive
- Known for: President and chief executive officer of Bank of the West (2016 to 2023)

Nandita Bakhshi is an Indian-born banking executive. She was president and chief executive officer of Bank of the West from 2016 until its acquisition by BMO in 2023, and was also co-chief executive officer of BNP Paribas USA.

== Education and early career ==
Bakhshi earned a bachelor's degree in history from the University of Calcutta and a master's degree in international relations from Jadavpur University. She moved from India to Albany, New York, in 1986 and began her banking career as a part-time teller at Northeast Savings Bank.

She later worked for Banc One in Columbus, Ohio, rising to regional manager, and joined Home Savings of America in 1996. At Home Savings, she worked on increasing the use of debit cards for retail purchases. Bakhshi joined FleetBoston Financial in 1998 as director of its deposit and payment product group, where her work included efforts to increase customer use of automated teller machines.

After two years with First Data in Germany, Bakhshi became executive vice president of payments at Washington Mutual in 2006. She remained there until the bank failed in 2008. She joined TD Bank in 2009 and held several positions, including head of its United States consumer banking business and head of North American direct channels.

== Bank of the West ==
Bank of the West selected Bakhshi as president and chief executive officer in 2016, succeeding Michael Shepherd. The San Francisco-based bank was then a subsidiary of BNP Paribas. A contemporary profile in American Banker identified low fee income and below-peer profitability as challenges facing the bank. Bakhshi said that expanding the customer base was a higher initial priority than increasing fees. She also served as co-chief executive officer of BNP Paribas USA.

During Bakhshi's tenure, Bank of the West restricted financing for activities including hydraulic fracturing and oil sands extraction. In 2018, United States senator John Barrasso criticized the policy in a public letter to Bakhshi, arguing that it would harm workers and communities dependent on fossil fuels. The bank later said that it had met a five-year goal of originating $1 billion in financing for renewable and clean energy ahead of schedule.

Bakhshi's tenure as chief executive ended in February 2023, when BMO completed its acquisition of Bank of the West. She then served as a special adviser during the integration. In December 2023, American Banker reported that she planned to retire from corporate banking while remaining on a BMO board.

== Board service ==
Bakhshi served on the board of the Federal Reserve Bank of San Francisco and has served on the board of Grameen America. She joined the board of Quaker Houghton in July 2024. As of September 2026, Quaker Houghton's corporate biography also listed her as a director of BMO Financial Corp. and BMO Bank, N.A.
