= Julius' Castle =

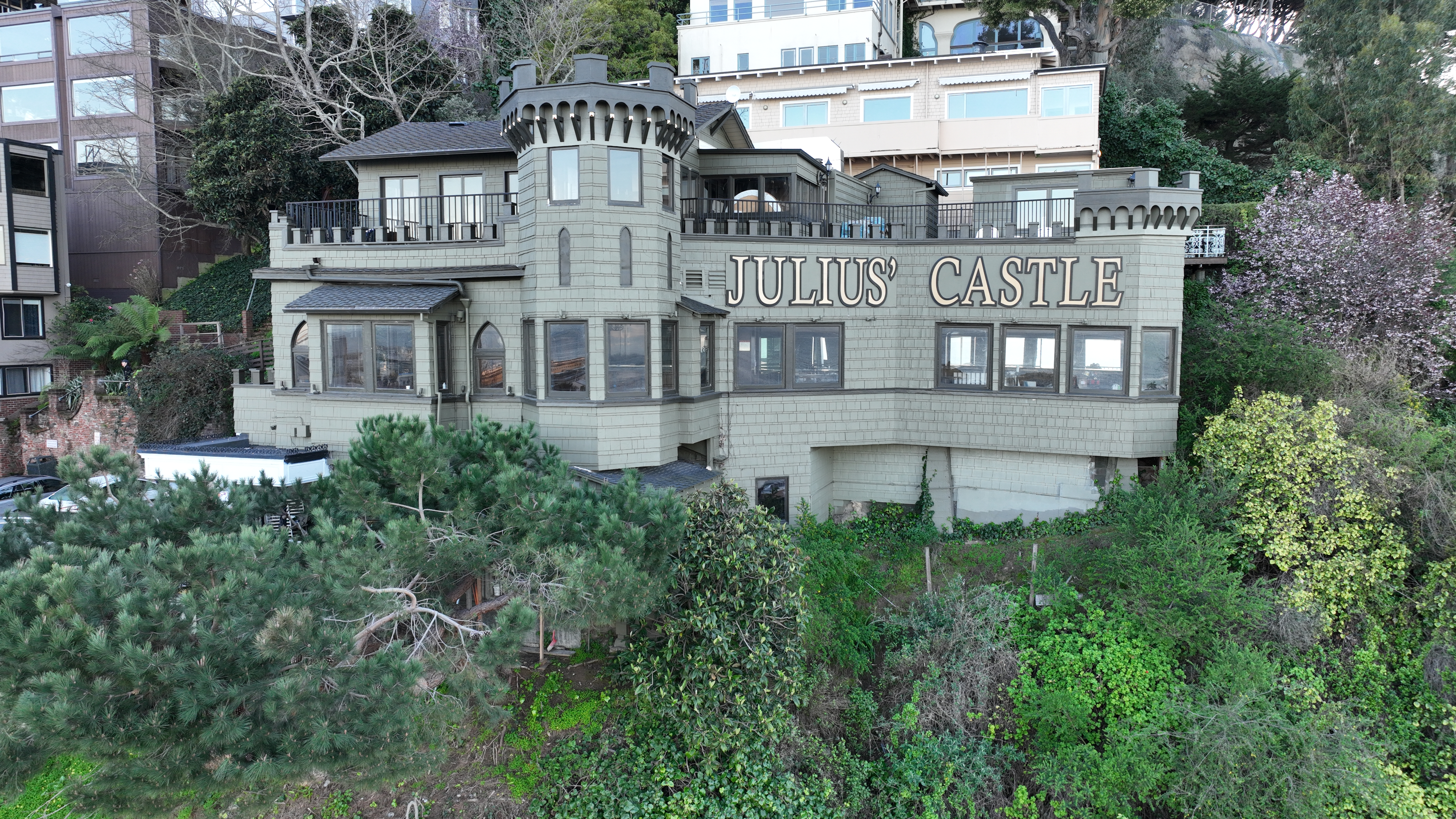
- Julius' Castle in 2023, side view, beside the Greenwich Steps

- Location within San Francisco County Location within California Location within the United States
- 37°48′11″N 122°24′18″W
- Location: 302 Greenwich Street, San Francisco, California

History
- Built: c.1924–1928

Site notes
- Architect: Luigi "Louis" Mastropasqua
- Architectural styles: Gothic Revival/Arts and Crafts
- Governing body: Private

San Francisco Designated Landmark
- Designated: 10 May 1980
- Reference no.: 121

Julius' Castle is a castle-shaped building that sits at 302 Greenwich Street on Telegraph Hill in San Francisco. It served as a visual landmark and as a restaurant for many years, originally opening between 1924 and 1928. Since 1980, the building has been listed as San Francisco Landmark Number 121. The architecture is described by the San Francisco Planning Department as, "primarily derived from the Gothic Revival and Arts & Crafts Styles".

== History ==
In 1886, the lot originally housed Michael Crowley's two-story grocery store. It was replaced by a family home, which burned down in a fire in 1917. In 1923, Julius Roz (1869–1947) began work with architect Luigi "Louis" Mastropasqua (1870–1951). The design of Julius' Castle was to pay tribute to Layman's Wooden Castle (also known as Layman’s Folly) a former German-style castle building that was a tourist attraction on Telegraph Hill from 1882 to 1903. Both Roz and Mastropasqua had emigrated from Italy to San Francisco a year prior to the closing of Layman's Folly. The Panama–Pacific International Exposition demolition in 1919 provided salvaged redwood and maple for the construction of Julius' Castle. In the 1920s the castle was painted pink. It operated as a speakeasy for a time during Prohibition.

Julius' Castle stayed open after Roz died in 1947. The interior was decorated in Victorian-era parlor style with views of the San Francisco Bay. It was very popular with celebrities, politicians and businessmen such as Robert Redford, Cary Grant, Sean Connery, Marlon Brando, Ginger Rogers, Sir Edmund Hillary, and the entire cast of the film The Empire Strikes Back. Julius' Castle makes appearances in Dashiell Hamett's novels. The 1951 film, The House on Telegraph Hill was filmed at Julius' Castle. It was designated a city landmark in 1980.

After being operated by a series of restaurant owners and managers, Julius' Castle closed in 2007. It was purchased in a 2012 bankruptcy sale by attorney Paul Scott, whose only restaurant experience had been working as a busboy as a teenager. In 2017, the City Planning unanimously approved the reopening of the eatery, "despite a litany of complaints." The Board of Supervisors rejected an appeal and affirmed the approval in 2018. A lawsuit brought by the Friends of Montgomery Street, a nonprofit, unincorporated group of neighbors opposed to the castle's reopening, was dismissed in early 2019; the court order rejected the noise, traffic and parking complaints, and found "no inappropriate environmental impacts." In 2020, just before the pandemic, it was reported that Scott was seeking operating partners to open the restaurant later that year. In 2024, it was reported that Scott had hired staff and was seeking a chef, with hopes of opening later that year. Scott said in July 2026 that a chef had been hired and Julius' Castle would reopen in September, serving dinner.

== Gallery ==
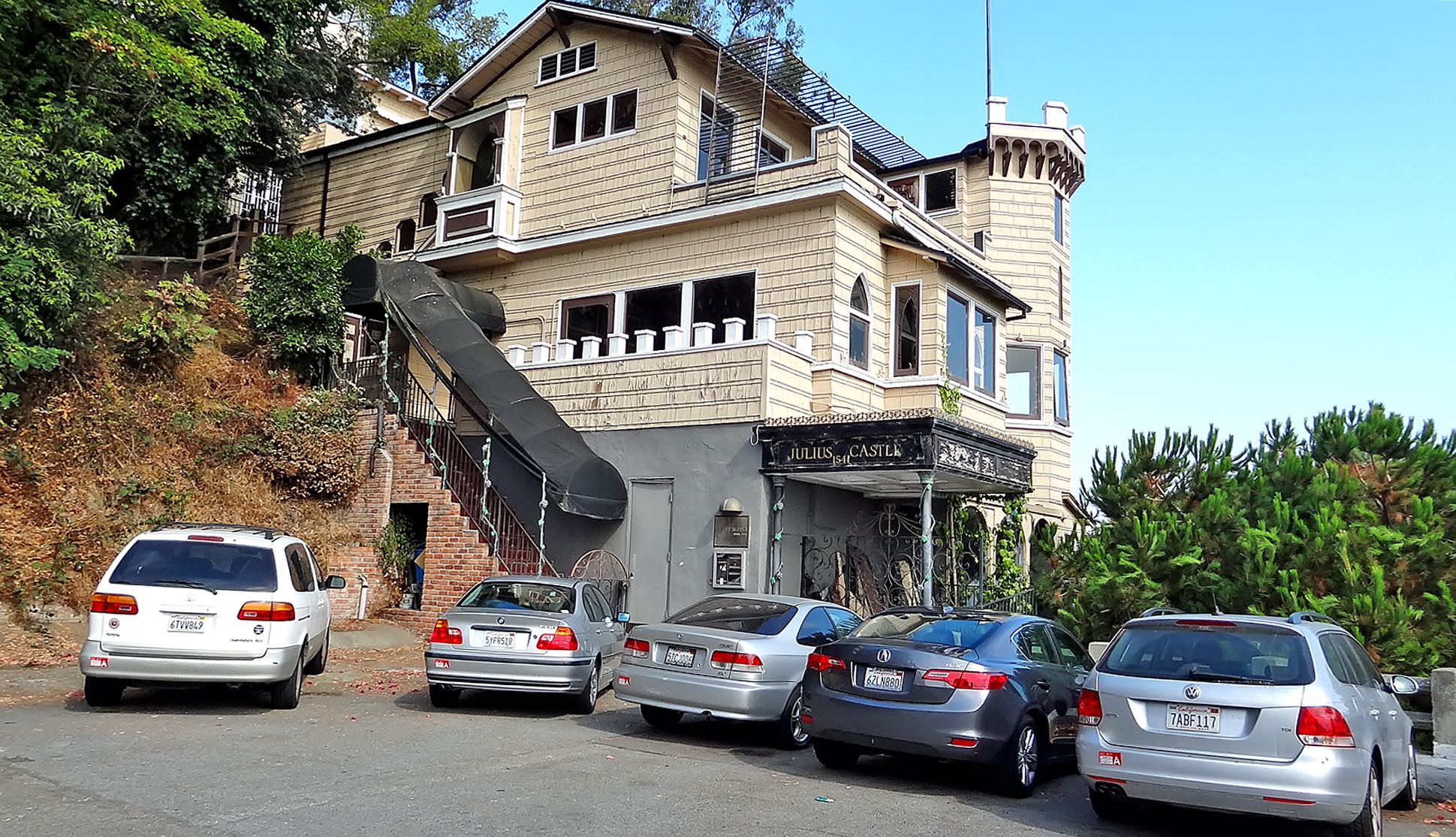

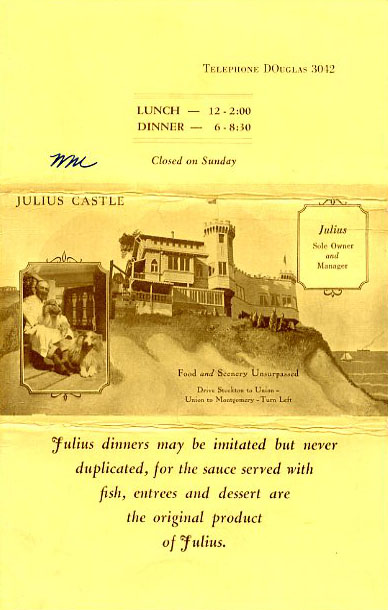
Julius’ Castle Menu, date unknown

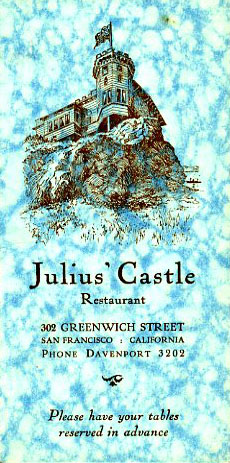
Julius’ Castle Menu, date unknown

== See also ==
- List of San Francisco Designated Landmarks
