= Union Safe Deposit Bank =

Deposit banks in the United States

The Union Safe Deposit Bank was founded in Stockton, California, United States in April 1897. It was purchased in 2004 by the Bank of the West, and all its branches were converted to Bank of the West on January 24, 2005.
