= 456 Montgomery Plaza =

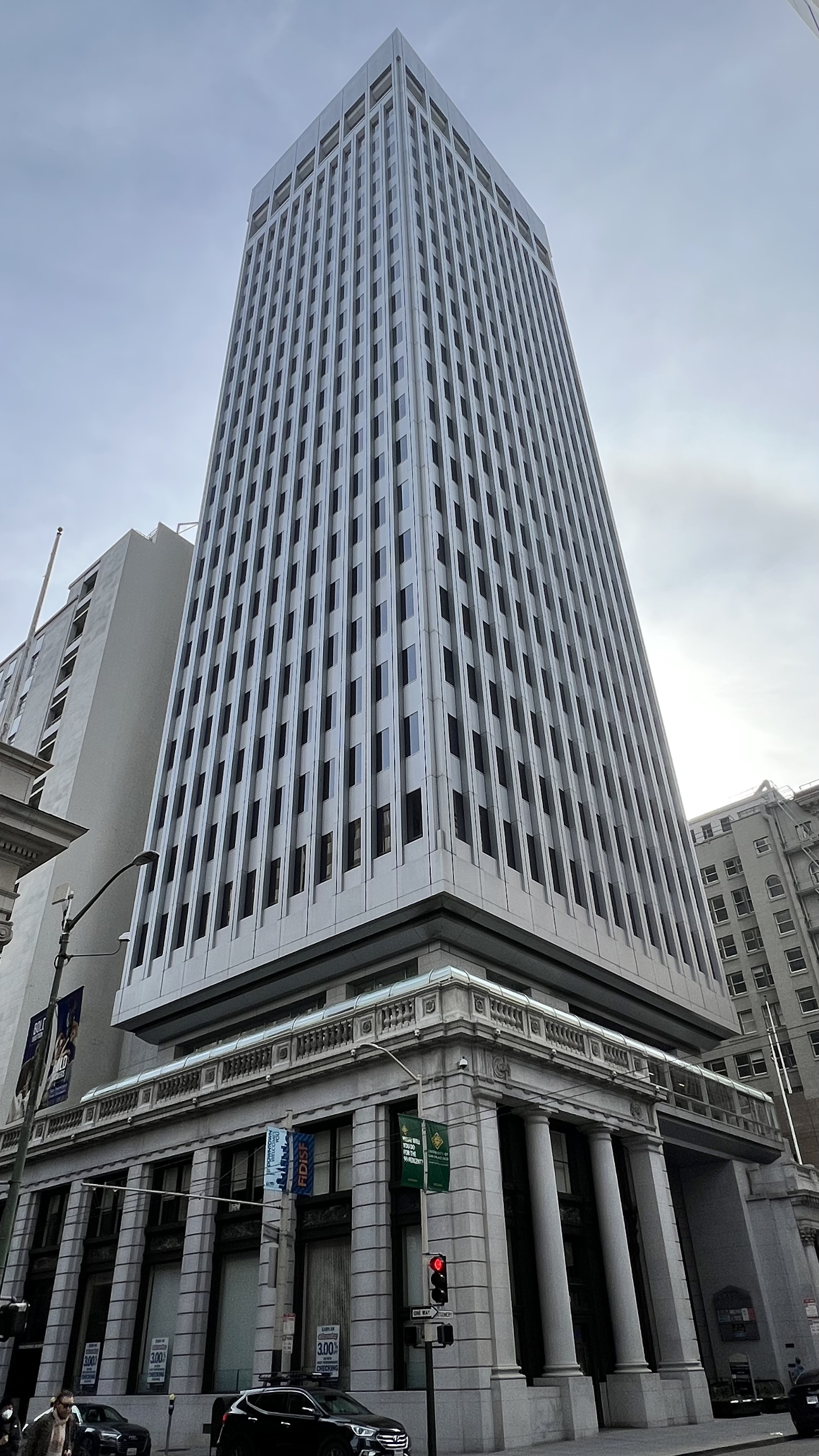
- View from the ground level

- Location within San Francisco

General information
- Type: Commercial offices
- Location: 456 Montgomery Street; San Francisco
- Coordinates: 37.793616°N 122.402759°W
- Completed: 1985

Height
- Roof: 379 ft (116 m)

Technical details
- Floor count: 26

Design and construction
- Architects: Roger Owen Boyer & Associates; MLT Architects

456 Montgomery Plaza is a 379 ft (116 m), 26-story class-A office skyscraper on Montgomery Street in the Financial District of San Francisco, California.

== History ==
456 Montgomery, completed in August 1985, is a 26-story steel frame high-rise office tower rising above two circa 1907 landmark granite banking facades. Serving as the primary building entrance at 456 Montgomery is the former bank of Borel & Co., designed by Albert Pissis, while at the corner of Montgomery and Sacramento Streets is the former Italian American Bank headquarters by Howard & Galloway that now fronts a leased commercial banking space at 460 Montgomery Street. The building also includes a sunken privately owned public space.

The modern tower retains the classic temple facades at its base. Preserving the two landmark facades took advantage of a new, and at times controversial, urban design precedent as illustrated by other similar projects such as 353 Sacramento and One Sansome Streets. All three of these projects serve to varying degrees of success as examples of a design strategy intended to resolve conflicts between the architectural preservation and development communities.

== See also ==
- List of tallest buildings in San Francisco
- List of privately owned public spaces in San Francisco
