= Fay Baker =

American actress (1917–1987)

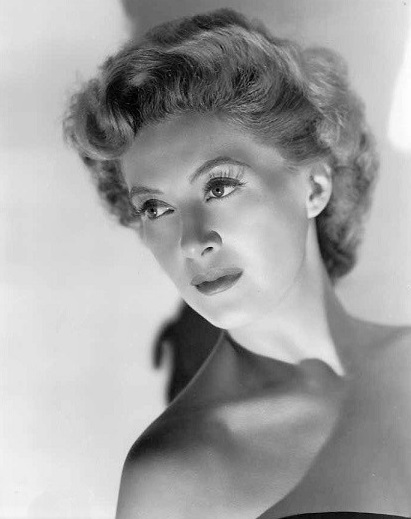
- Baker in 1950
- Born: Fay Schwager; January 31, 1917; New York City, U.S.
- Died: December 8, 1987 (aged 70); Sleepy Hollow, New York, U.S.
- Other names: Beth Holmes
- Occupations: Actress, writer
- Years active: 1938–1965
- Spouse: Arthur Weiss (m. 1940; div. 1965)
- Children: 2

Fay Baker (born Fay Schwager; January 31, 1917 – December 8, 1987) was an American stage, film and television actress and writer. Using the pen name Beth Holmes she wrote the novel The Whipping Boy. She also published, under her own name, My Darling, Darling Doctors.

== Early years ==
Baker's father was a surgeon, and her mother was a pharmacist. She attended Smith College.

== Career ==
Roles on radio soap operas provided Baker's early professional acting experience. Her Broadway career began in 1938 with a role in Danton's Death. Her final Broadway role was in Wonderful Journey (1946).

Baker remained in Hollywood for nearly two decades, acting in two dozen films, including star billing in The House on Telegraph Hill (1951).

She had a leading role in the 1950 crime drama Double Deal, and later played one of Ethel Barrymore's two daughters trying to seize control of and sell editor Humphrey Bogart's newspaper in the 1952 drama Deadline - U.S.A.

During her California years, she also appeared frequently on television. She is credited with guest parts on 30 different series beginning with Your Show Time in 1949 up to her final performance on Dr. Kildare in 1963. Her roles included comedy sitcoms (Hazel, The Donna Reed Show), drama (Perry Mason), and westerns (Have Gun - Will Travel). In 1958, she made two guest appearances on Perry Mason, playing Marian Newburn in "The Case of the Demure Defendant" and Stephanie Sabin in "The Case of the Perjured Parrot".

Prior to 1963, Baker began writing when a problem with her back prevented her from acting. She began work on a book and sold some nonfiction pieces to magazines, in addition to receiving $50,000 from a producer for one of her stories.

== Personal life ==
Baker married writer/producer Arthur Weiss on August 3, 1940, in Manhattan. They had two children, her son Jonathan was born in 1950, before divorcing in 1965. While Weiss remained in California working for Irwin Allen, she returned to New York with her two children and began a new career as an author.

Baker used the pen name "Beth Holmes" to shield her family from being compared with fictional characters in the novel.

Baker was diagnosed with breast cancer in 1972 and described the experience in her memoir, My Darling, Darling Doctors in 1975. She lost her 15-year battle with breast cancer on December 8, 1987, at age 70.

== Filmography ==
Film
| Year | Title | Role | Notes |
|---|---|---|---|
| 1946 | Notorious | Ethel | |
| 1948 | Trapped by Boston Blackie | Margie O'Reilly, alias Sandra Doray | IMDb |
| 1948 | The Gentleman from Nowhere | Catherine Ashton | |
| 1948 | The Saxon Charm | Mrs. Noble | Uncredited |
| 1948 | No Minor Vices | Mrs. Felton | Uncredited |
| 1948 | Family Honeymoon | Fran Wilson | Uncredited |
| 1949 | Manhattan Angel | Vi Langdon | IMDb |
| 1949 | Black Midnight | Martha Baxter | IMDb |
| 1949 | Tell It to the Judge | Valerie Hobson | |
| 1950 | Chain Lightning | Mrs. Willis | |
| 1950 | Father of the Bride | Miss Bellamy (Stanley's secretary) | Uncredited |
| 1950 | Double Deal | Lilly Sebastian | |
| 1951 | The Company She Keeps | Tilly Thompson | |
| 1951 | The House on Telegraph Hill | Margaret | |
| 1951 | Reunion in Reno | Miss Pearson | IMDb |
| 1952 | Deadline - U.S.A. | Alice Garrison Courtney | |
| 1952 | The Star | Faith, Margaret's sister | |
| 1953 | The Blue Gardenia | Switchboard Monitor | Uncredited |
| 1953 | Invaders from Mars | Mrs. Wilson | Uncredited |
| 1954 | Phffft! | Radio Actress as 'Nurse Serena' | Uncredited |
| 1955 | I Died a Thousand Times | Woman in Tropico Lobby | Uncredited |
| 1956 | Don't Knock the Rock | Arlene MacLaine | |
| 1957 | She Devil | Evelyn Kendall | IMDb |
| 1957 | Sorority Girl | Mrs. Tanner | |
| 1965 | The Slender Thread | Telephone Supervisor | Uncredited, (final film role) |

== TV appearances ==
TV
| TV Show | Role | Episode | Year |
|---|---|---|---|
| Your Show Time | | The Necklace | 1949 |
| Fireside Theatre | | Dinner for Three | 1950 |
| Dangerous Assignment | Countess Todesca | The Knitting Needle Story | 1952 |
| The Doctor | | The Hiding Place | 1952 |
| Cavalcade of America | | A Romance to Remember | 1952 |
| Sky King | Lucille Bradley | Wings of Justice | 1952 |
| Rebound | | Quiet Sunday | 1953 |
| The Millionaire | Margaret Browning | The Margaret Browning Story | 1955 |
| The Loretta Young Show | Pat Wadlington | Let Columbus Discover You | 1955 |
| Damon Runyon Theatre | Adele Salisbury | Old Em's Kentucky Home | 1955 |
| Four Star Playhouse | Claire Dumont | Man in the Cellar | 1954 |
| Four Star Playhouse | Nadine | The Case of Emily Carmeron | 1956 |
| Mr. Adams and Eve | Gloria | The Proposal | 1957 |
| State Trooper | Judith Andrews | Weep No More O'Grady | 1957 |
| Schlitz Playhouse of Stars | Sylvia | The Girl in the Grass | 1957 |
| The Ford Television Theatre | Laura Van Cleve | Singapore | 1957 |
| The Adventures of Jim Bowie | Charlotte De Vaux | A Fortune for Madame | 1957 |
| The Life and Legend of Wyatt Earp | Marie Burden | Bad Woman | 1957 |
| San Francisco Beat | Elsie Folger | The Jealous Mambo Dancer Case | 1958 |
| Mickey Spillane's Mike Hammer | Margaret Green | Letter Edged in Blackmail | 1958 |
| The Court of Last Resort | Mrs. Laura Barclay | The Stephen Lowell Case | 1958 |
| M Squad | Helen Greville | Day of Terror | 1958 |
| Perry Mason | Marian Newburn | The Case of the Demure Defendant | 1958 |
| Perry Mason | Stephanie Sabin | The Case of the Perjured Parrot | 1958 |
| Have Gun - Will Travel | Mrs. Grayson | Lady on the Stagecoach | 1959 |
| The David Niven Show | Sarah Winter | The Promise | 1959 |
| New Comedy Showcase | Annie Bradley | Maggie (unsold pilot) | 1960 |
| The Donna Reed Show | Hope | Donna Goes to a Reunion | 1960 |
| 77 Sunset Strip | Caroline Kinares | Strange Bedfellows | 1961 |
| The Ann Sothern Show | Mildred Holliday | Five Year Itch | 1959 |
| The Ann Sothern Show | Louise | The Roman Hatter | 1960 |
| The Ann Sothern Show | Miss Norton | Pandora | 1961 |
| This Is the Life | | The Sin of Silence | 1961 |
| The Roaring 20's | Carlotta La Salle | No Exit | 1961 |
| Hazel | Madeleine Van Dyke | Number, Please? | 1962 |
| Dr. Kildare | Mrs. Tucker | A Very Infectious Disease | 1963 |

== Playlist ==
Plays
| Year | Play | Role | Notes |
|---|---|---|---|
| 1946 | Wonderful Journey | Julia Farnsworth | Dec 25, 1946 - Jan 1, 1947 |
| 1944 | Violet | Crystal | Oct 24, 1944 - Nov 11, 1944 |
| 1943 | Another Love Story | Celia Hale | Oct 12, 1943 - Jan 8, 1944 |
| 1942 | The Sun Field | Mildred Deagon | Dec 9, 1942 - Dec 12, 1942 |
| 1942 | Journey to Jerusalem | The Greek Woman | Oct 5, 1940 - Oct 19, 1940 |
| 1942 | The Taming of the Shrew | Bianca | Feb 5, 1940 - Feb 10, 1940 |
| 1938 | Danton's Death | Voice in the Street | Nov 2, 1938 - Nov 1938 |
