= 180 Montgomery Street =

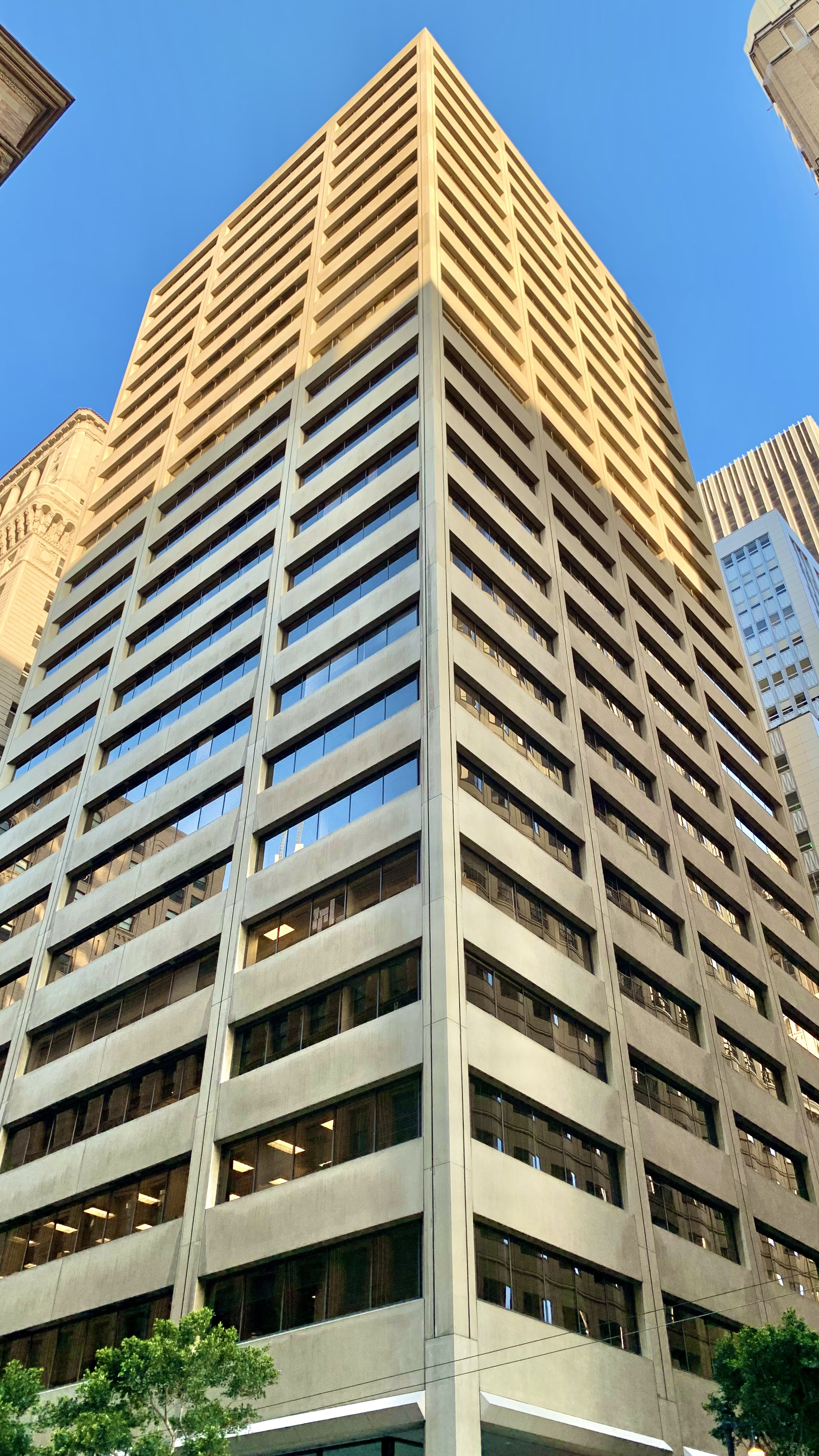
- In 2021
- Interactive map of the 180 Montgomery Street area
- Alternative names: Bank of the West Building

General information
- Type: Commercial offices
- Location: 180 Montgomery Street; San Francisco, California
- Coordinates: 37.790766°N 122.402034°W
- Completed: 1979
- Owner: Mitsui Fudosan; The Swig Company
- Operator: The Swig Company

Height
- Roof: 98 m (322 ft)

Technical details
- Floor count: 24
- Floor area: 300,000 sq ft (28,000 m^{2})
- Lifts/elevators: 8 passenger 1 freight

Design and construction
- Architects: Booth Architects; Fee Munson Ebert
- Developer: The Carlyle Group

180 Montgomery Street is a 25-story, 98 m (322 ft) Class A office building in the financial district of San Francisco, California. The building serves as the corporate headquarters for Bank of the West, and has offices for other major tenants such as Ameriprise Financial, Berlitz, Hanjin Shipping, Kforce, Valimail, Lexmark, Prudential Insurance, the Union Labor Life Insurance Company, and Western Union.

180 Montgomery is owned by a joint venture formed in 2007 between Mitsui Fudosan America, Inc. and The Swig Company.

It sits on the site of the former Occidental Hotel, which was destroyed in the 1906 earthquake.

== See also ==
- San Francisco's tallest buildings
