= Omni San Francisco Hotel =

Historic hotel in California, U.S.

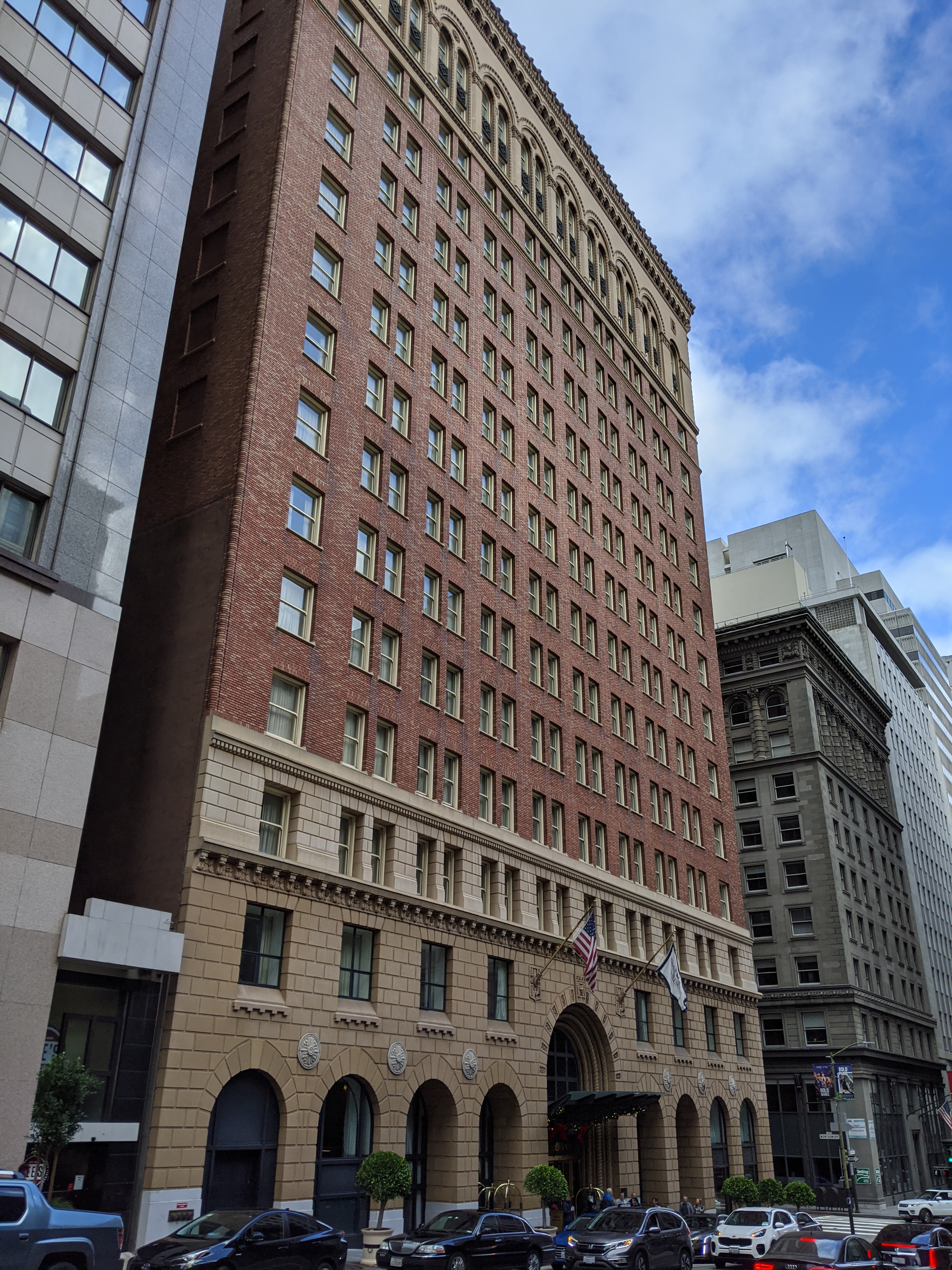
- Hotel in 2019, California Street facade

- Location within California Location within the United States

General information
- Location: San Francisco, California
- Coordinates: 37.793037°N 122.403194°W
- Completed: 1927

The Omni San Francisco Hotel, formerly the Financial Center Building, located at the northwest corner of Montgomery and California streets in the San Francisco Financial District, dates from 1927, when it was built as a bank.

== History ==
The building was built on the site of the Parrott Building, a three-story building erected in 1852 by Chinese mechanics and laborers with granite from China on contract from early San Francisco settler John Parrott. The building was demolished in 1926 to make room for construction of the current high-rise tower. The demolition prompted a treasure hunt due to rumors that early settlers had buried Mexican doubloons, gold nuggets, jewels, and property deeds on the property.

A new 15-story, steel-frame building was built on the site with the construction completed in January 1927. The new building, known as the Financial Center Building, was designed by architect Frederick H. Meyer and Albin R. Johnson. The building included Florentine Renaissance and Richardsonian Romanesque design elements. The facade featured rusticated cast stone on the first five floors, a red-brick facade and higher floors, and a corbelled cast-stone cornice arcade on the top floor.

In 1956, the building's owner (First Western Bank & Trust) substantially remodeled and "modernized" the exterior base of the building, interior entrance and lobby. The cast stone on the exterior of the lower floors was removed and replaced with polished granite cladding. The building's original arched windows were also replaced with rectangular storefront windows. Marble wainscotting, door trim, and bronze elevator doors were also removed.

By 1997, the building had been vacant for several years when it was acquired by Omni Hotels. Omni's plans to convert the building to a hotel were delayed for several years. In 2001 and 2002, the building was renovated at a reported cost of $125 million. The renovation was designed by Patri Merker Architects. Elements of the 1956 modernization were reversed to restore the building's original design. Original 1926 drawings were used to restore the stone facade and other exterior design elements. The property's square footage was also substantially increased by raising the roof and addition of an 80,000-square-foot structure at the rear.

The building has been given an "A" rating by the City of San Francisco indicating that it is of "highest importance" in evaluating historic buildings. The hotel is a member of the Historic Hotels of America, an official program of the National Trust for Historic Preservation.

== Gallery ==
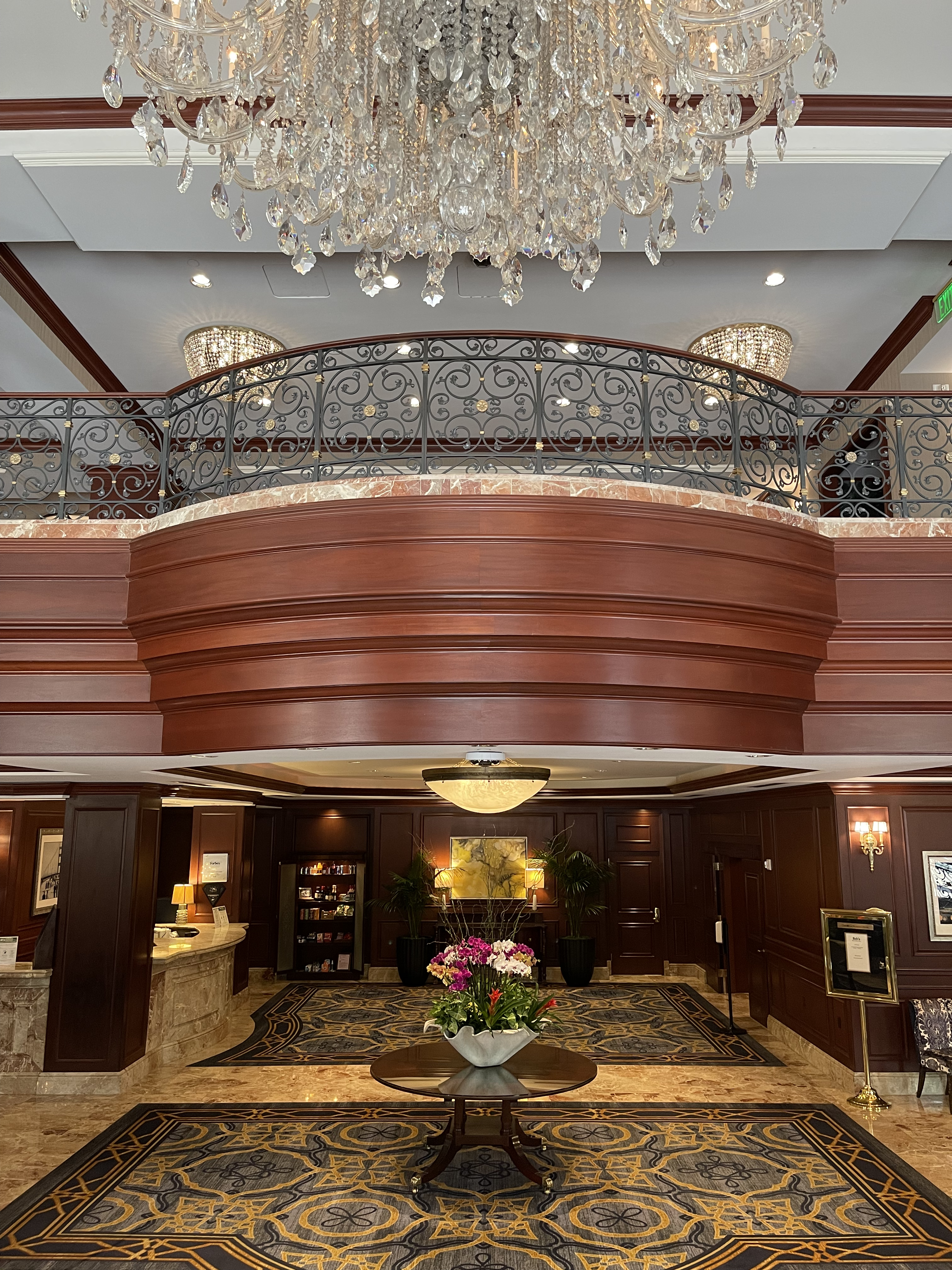
Lobby at the Omni
