= Italian American Bank =

Historic building in San Francisco

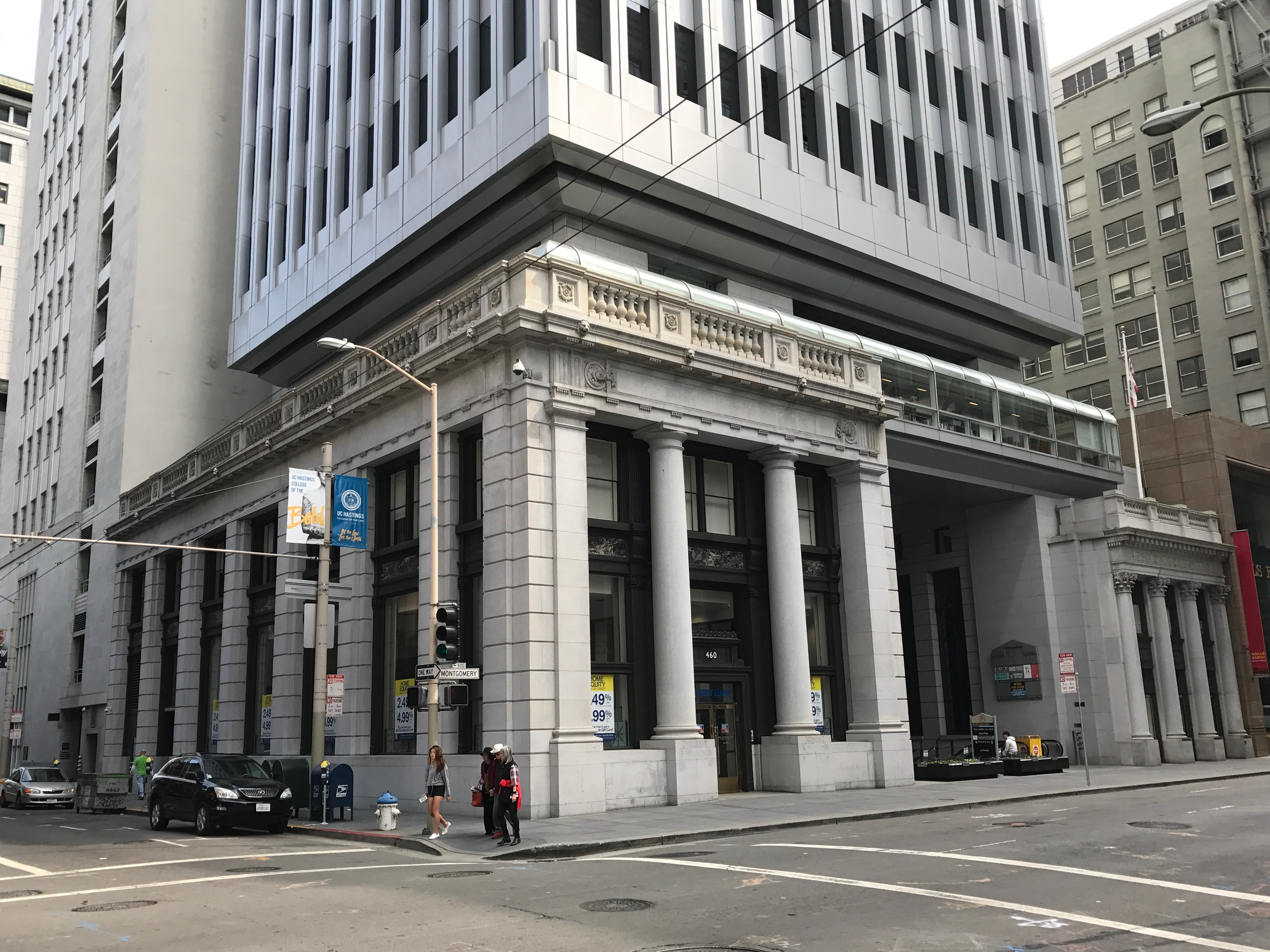
- Former Italian American Bank at 460 Montgomery Street (2017)

- Location within San Francisco County Location within California Location within the United States
- 37.793749°N 122.402834°W
- Location: 460 Montgomery Street, San Francisco, California, U.S.

History
- Built: 1907

Site notes
- Architect: Howard & Galloway

San Francisco Designated Landmark
- Designated: April 6, 1980
- Reference no.: 110

Italian American Bank is a historic building built in 1907, and located on 460 Montgomery Street in San Francisco, California. The Italian American Bank building has been listed as a San Francisco Designated Landmark since April 6, 1980.

== History ==
A brick building with 7-stories was in the same location, owned by the Italian American Bank, and was destroyed during the 1906 San Francisco earthquake.

The 1907, a 2-story replacement building was designed by the architecture firm Howard & Galloway and built during a period of reconstruction in the neighborhood, using steel reinforced concrete, bricks, and granite. The Italian American Bank has a basement level.

The building was subject to facadism by architectural firm Roger Owen Boyer and Associates, and it was combined with the neighboring Borel & Co. building (1908), in order to create 456 Montgomery Plaza.

== See also ==
- Fugazi Bank Building
- List of San Francisco Designated Landmarks
