= Commercial Union Assurance Building =

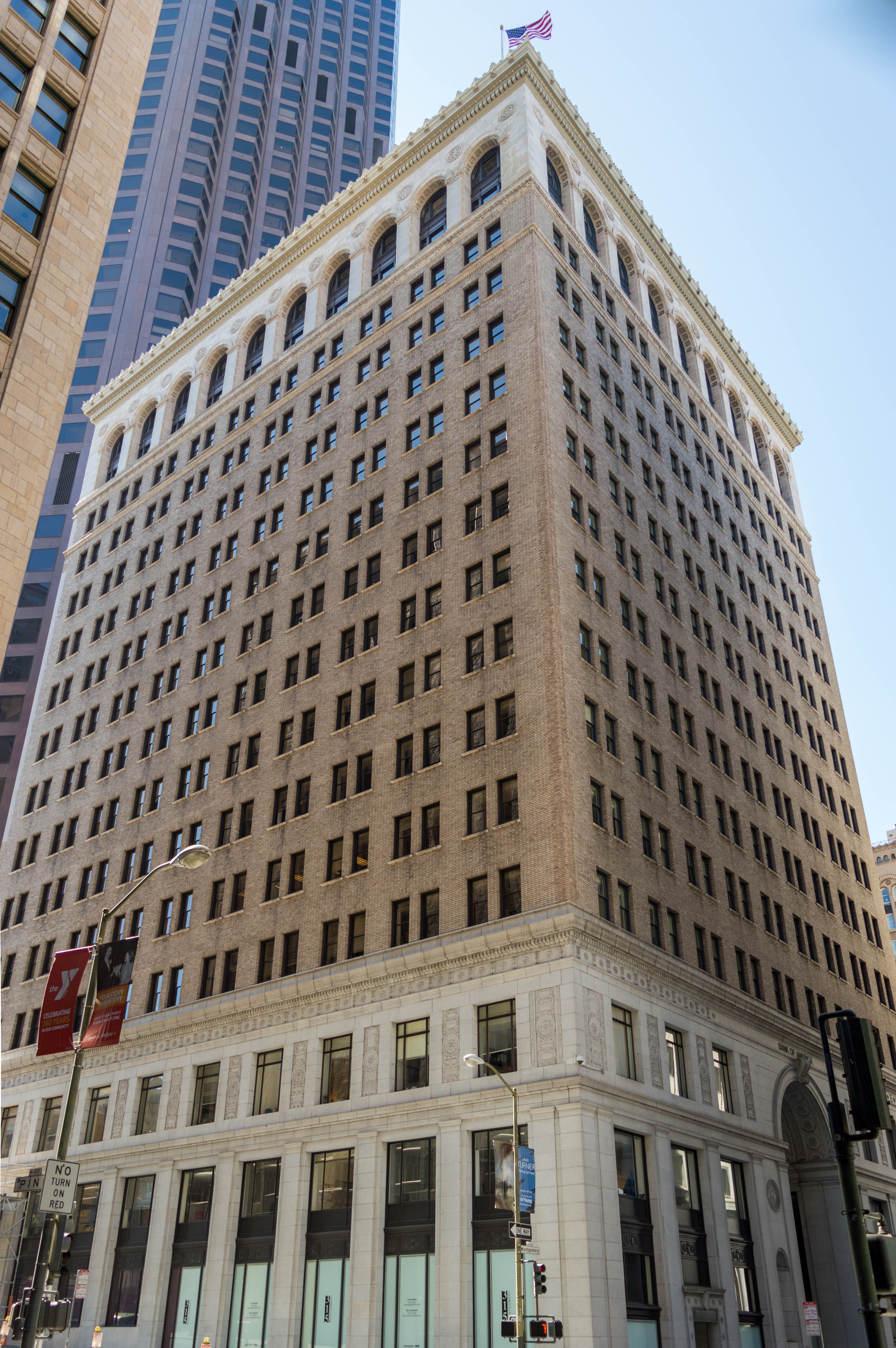
- The Commercial Union Assurance Building in July 2015.

- Location within San Francisco Commercial Union Assurance Building (California) Commercial Union Assurance Building (the United States)

General information
- Status: Completed
- Type: Commercial offices
- Architectural style: Renaissance Revival
- Location: 315 Montgomery Street; San Francisco, California
- Coordinates: 37.792111°N 122.403°W
- Completed: 1921

Height
- Roof: 94 m (308 ft)

Technical details
- Floor count: 16

Design and construction
- Architect: George W. Kelham

The Commercial Union Assurance Building is a 94 m (308 ft), 16-story office building located in the Financial District of San Francisco, California. The building was completed in 1921 and is the same height of the San Francisco City Hall. The much taller 555 California Street is to the west of this Renaissance Revival styled building. Floors 9 and 10 are now flexible coworking spaces

== See also ==
- List of tallest buildings in San Francisco
