= California Street Cable Railroad =

Cable car operator in San Francisco, California

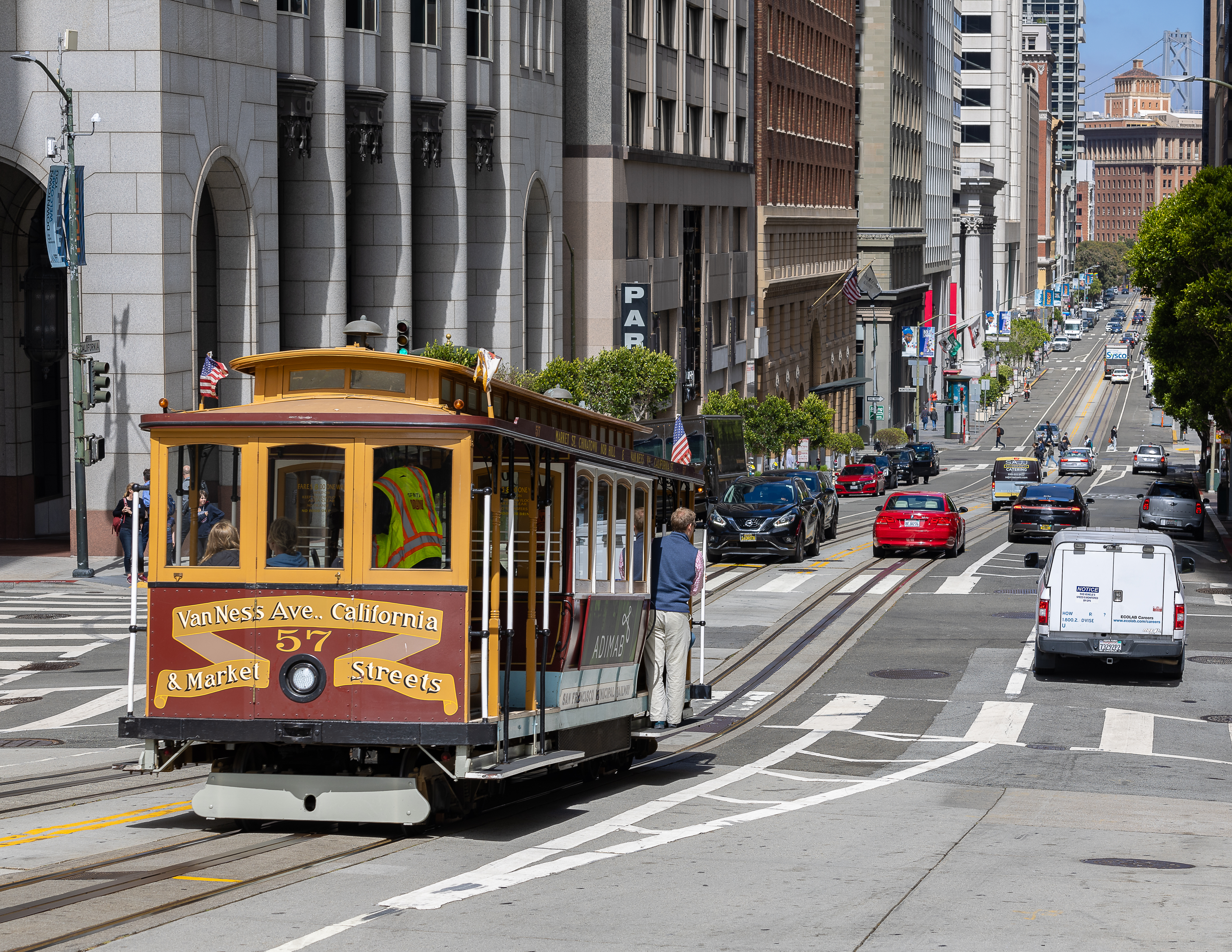
California Street Cable Railroad car near Kearny Street, June 2022

The California Street Cable Railroad (Cal Cable) was a long-serving cable car operator in San Francisco, founded by Leland Stanford. The company's first line opened on California Street in 1878. Operations were sold to the city in 1952, who discontinued some sections of line. A section of the original route on California Street is the oldest cable car line still in operation.

== History ==
The company was established in August 1876 as the California Street Railroad, under the direction of Leland Stanford, Andrew Smith Hallidie, David Porter, P. H. Canavan, and Joseph Britton. Stanford had received permission earlier in the year to lay a "wire-rope railroad" on California Street. Active construction began in July 1878 with groundbreaking on the power house at the corner of Larkin Street. With the inclusion of Hallidie, the company would utilize grip technology developed by his own National Cable Railway Company. Track laying was completed that December — the line ran from Kearny to Fillmore — though laying of the cable would not commence until the following February. Even then, the road was rough and unpaved from Kearny to Stockton up until shortly before the commencement of service.

The first few weeks of service were somewhat unreliable. A cable break on the first day of trial operation on March 30, 1878 required horses to pull disabled cars back to the car barn. Further tests on April 6 were more successful. The California Street Railroad was informally opened to the public at 6 o'clock on April 10. Many of the conductors appeared in a new blue uniform, equipped with equally new fare enforcement equipment. During the morning, only the dummies were run, but in the afternoon several of the new cars were put on. Issues still persisted for about another week before the cable was being run at its full 6 miles per hour (9.7 km/h) on April 19. The line claimed its first casualty the following day, when Frank Spearman, a carpenter from Ireland, was crushed under a dummy which had just departed from Fillmore.

The Sutter Street Railroad operated on a segment of California Street, blocking further extension of the California cable line. Community support coalesced behind the Sutter Street line being abandoned and the Cal cable to be extended out to its franchised terminus at First Avenue. The cable line would be extended to Central Avenue (later Presidio Avenue).

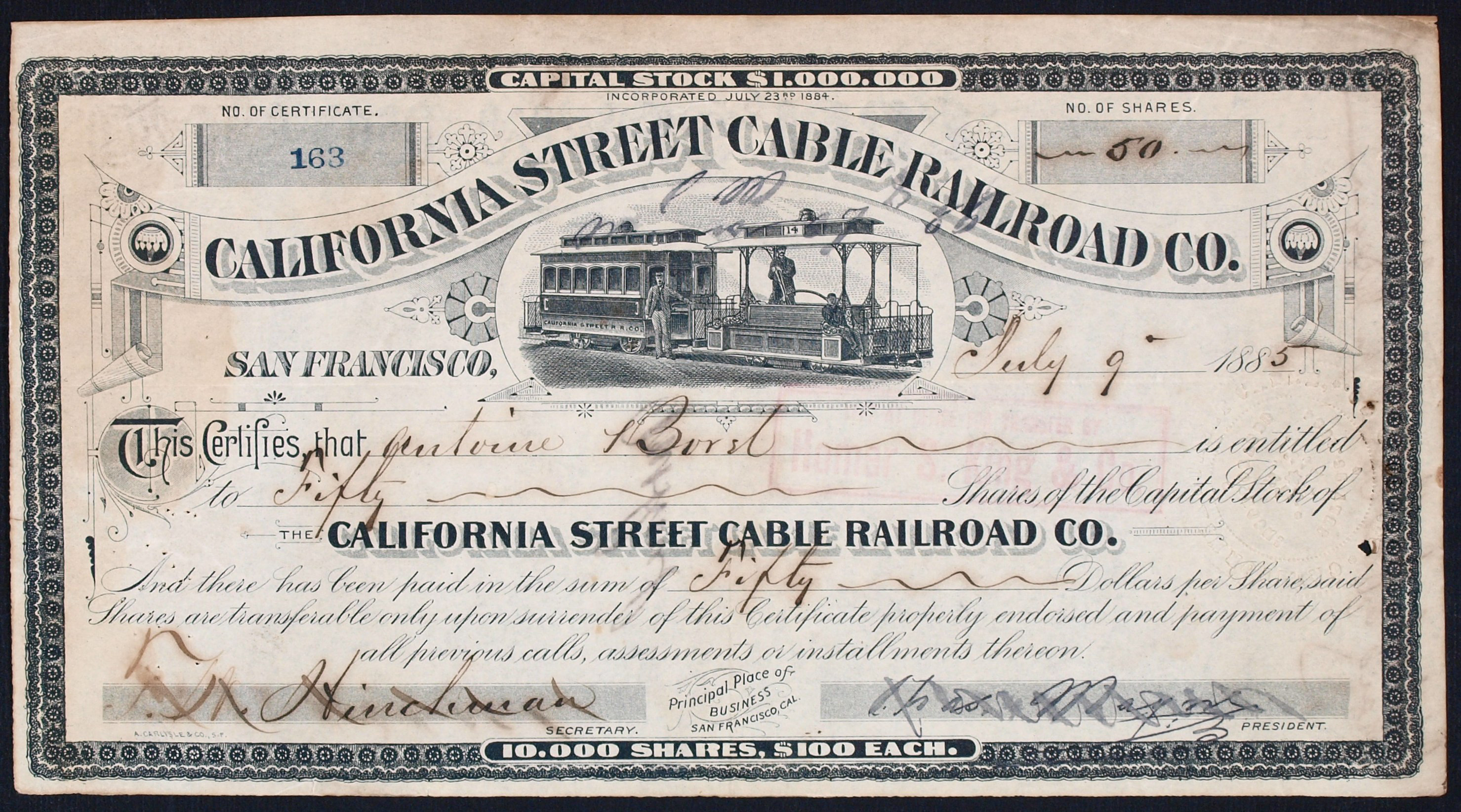
Share of the California Street Cable Railroad Co., issued July 9, 1885.

The remainder of the route to First Avenue would be built as a normal (non-cable) railroad, utilizing a locomotive and single coach rented from the Southern Pacific Railroad. This began service on February 6, 1880. This was replaced with a horsecar after about 1884. This line was transferred to the Ferries and Cliff House Railroad to serve as that company's connection to the city. Cal Cable riders would receive a free transfer to the new line.

Two extensions to the system commenced in 1890. The minor of the two was the California Street line to Drumm Street, within 100 yards (91 m) of the wharves. A new cross-town route was also ran via Jones, Pine, Hyde, and O'Farrell, which opened in 1891. This would be the last entirely new cable route in the city.

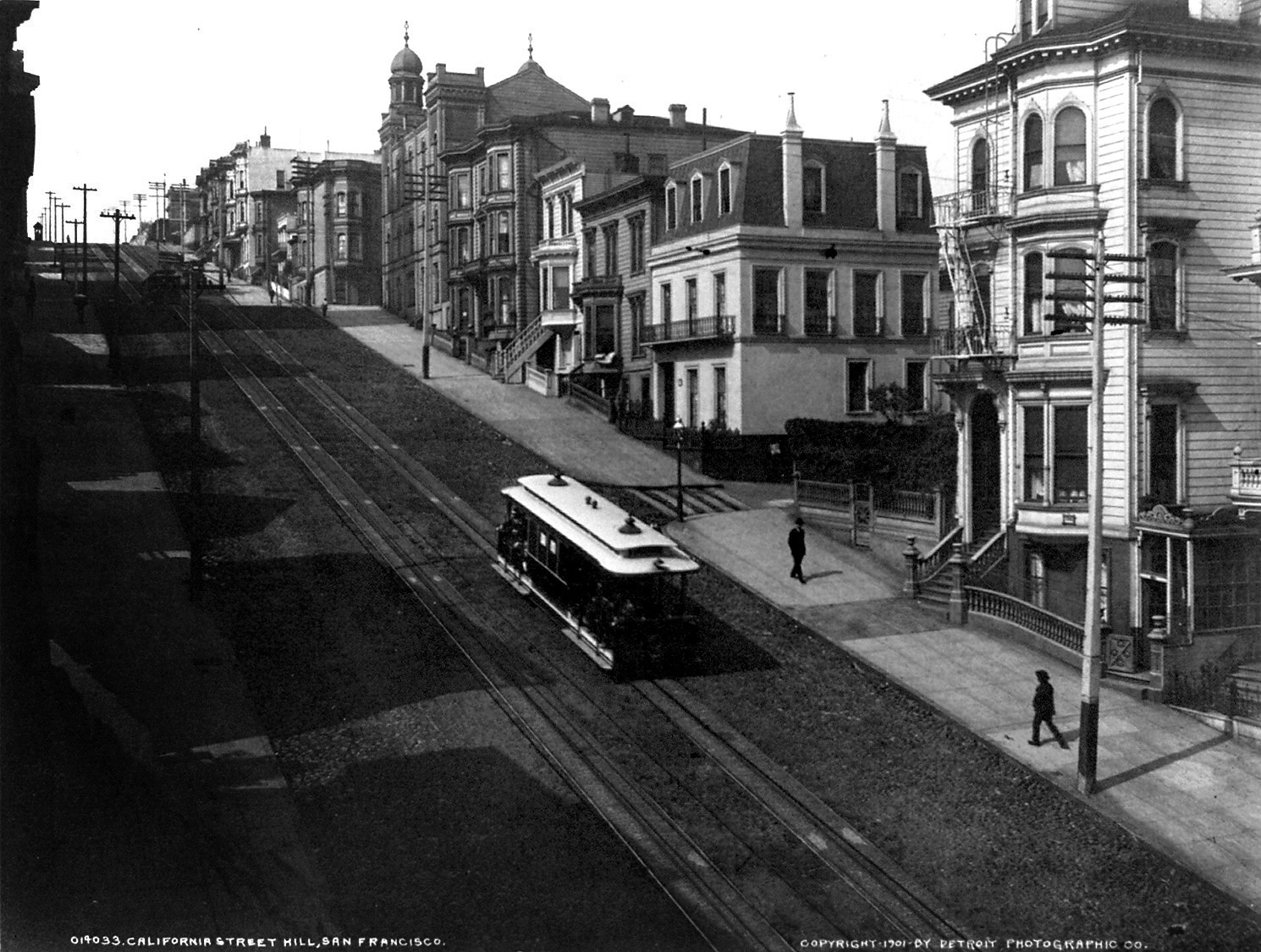
California Street with cable car in center, 1901.

The company remained independent until 1951, outlasting all the other commercial streetcar and cable car operators in the city. An indictment in an injury case and subsequent dropping of its insurance forced the company to suspend operations. The city purchased and reopened the lines in 1952; the current cable car system is a hybrid made up of the California Street line, and the Hyde Street section of Cal Cable's O'Farrell, Jones & Hyde line, together with other lines already in municipal ownership.

Some surplus cable cars were sold to Knott's Berry Farm which operated them at its Southern California amusement park from 1955 to 1978. At the end of this period, some were sold back and one (#43) is preserved at the Southern California Railway Museum.

== California type streetcar ==
California's mild climate encouraged an innovative streetcar design first used on the California Street Cable Railroad in 1890. The cars feature an enclosed center section with open seating on each end of the car. These California type streetcars were subsequently adopted by many California electric railways, including Pacific Electric, Los Angeles Railway and San Francisco, Napa and Calistoga Railway.

== See also ==
- San Francisco cable car system
