= Bank of the West =

Defunct American financial institution

- Formerly: The Farmers National Gold Bank of San Jose (1874–1880); The First National Bank of San Jose (1880–1979)
- Type: Subsidiary (1979–2023)
- Industry: Banking
- Founded: 1874; 152 years ago
- Defunct: 1979; 47 years ago (as an independent bank); February 3, 2023; 3 years ago (as a subsidiary bank); September 5, 2023; 3 years ago (as a brand)
- Fate: Acquired by Bank of Montreal
- Successor: BMO Bank
- Headquarters: San Jose, California (1874–1980); 180 Montgomery Street; San Francisco, California (1980–2023); Major Support Centers: Omaha, Nebraska; Fargo, North Dakota; Denver, Colorado; Greater Los Angeles
- Key people: Nandita Bakhshi, CEO & President
- Revenue: ▲US$2.75 billion (2020)
- Net income: ▲US$593 million (2020)
- Number of employees: 9,261 (2020)
- Parent: BNP (1979–2000); BNP Paribas (2000–2023); Bank of Montreal (2023)
- Website: Archived official website at the Wayback Machine (archive index)

Bank of the West was an American financial institution headquartered in San Francisco, California, United States. It had more than 600 branches and offices in the Midwest and Western United States.

It was founded in 1874 in San Jose, California, as the Farmers National Gold Bank of San Jose. Bank of the West was then owned by the French banking group BNP from 1979 to 2023. Canadian banking group Bank of Montreal (BMO) completed the acquisition of Bank of the West in February 2023, with the intention of absorbing it into BMO's U.S. subsidiary BMO Harris Bank. Over the ensuing Labor Day weekend, the Bank of the West brand was retired, and all accounts and branches from both subsidiaries were converted and merged into the renamed BMO Bank by September 5.

== History ==
=== Formation ===
Bank of the West began as Farmers National Gold Bank of San Jose, California, in 1874. When all bank notes became convertible to gold or silver in 1880, the bank converted from a gold national bank and changed its name to the First National Bank of San Jose, California.

=== Acquisition by BNP Paribas ===
In 1970, Banque Nationale de Paris (BNP) established the French Bank of California. Later that decade, First National Bank of San Jose changed its name to Bank of the West. In 1979, BNP bought Bank of the West and merged in the French Bank of California. The bank owned 35 locations and $350 million in assets.

In May 2000, BNP and Paribas merged to form BNP Paribas.

=== Mergers and expansions ===
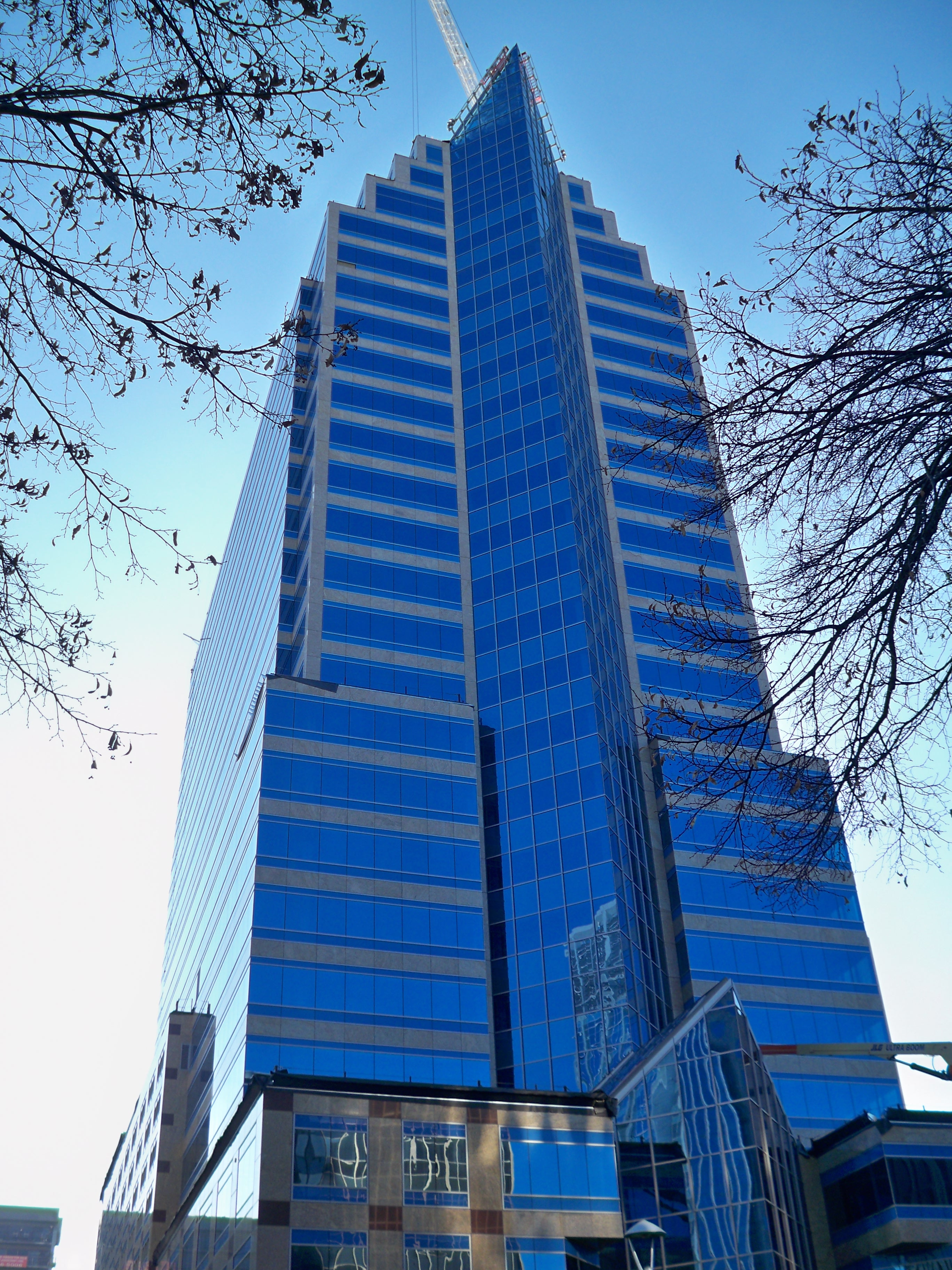
The Bank of the West Tower in Sacramento, California

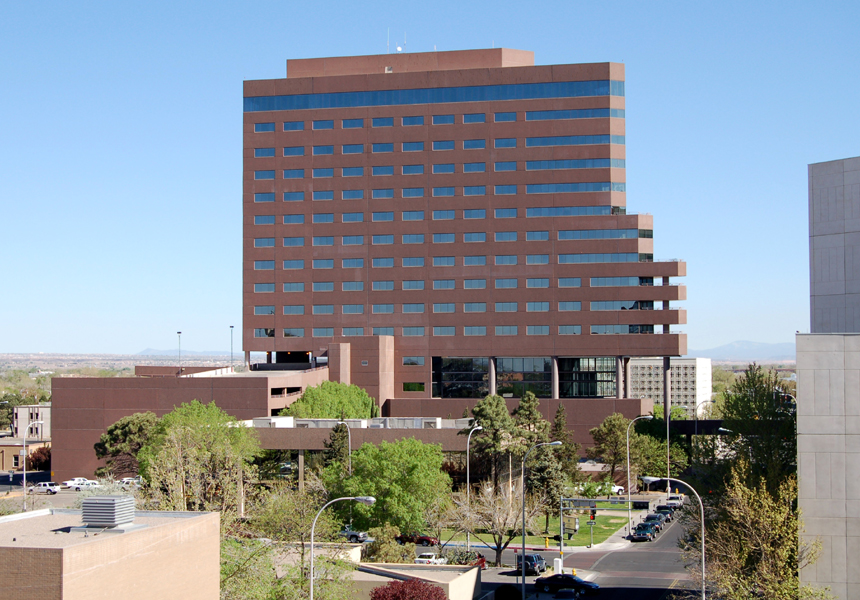
Albuquerque Petroleum Building known as the "Bank of the West Tower" is a corporate office building of Bank of the West in Albuquerque.

Throughout the 1980s and 1990s, Bank of the West bought several other banks and branches. In 1987, Bank of the West bought Bank of Los Gatos. (Note: Bank of Los Gatos had been founded in 1883. When Bank of the West bought it in 1987, it had failed.) This was followed by the 1990 purchase of Central Banking Systems; the 1991 purchase of 30 branches in northern California from failed Imperial Savings and Loan; the 1992 purchase of Atlantic Financial Federal Savings Bank from the Resolution Trust Corporation; the 1993 purchase of 15 branches in northern California from Citibank for $360 million; the 1995 purchase of NorthBay Savings Bank, headquartered in Petaluma, California; and the 1997 purchase of branches from Bank of America and Coast Federal Bank.

In 1995, First Hawaiian Bank established Pacific One Bank to hold 30 branches in Washington, Oregon, and Idaho that it acquired from West One Bank when that bank was acquired by U.S. Bancorp and had to divest certain assets, due to the number of preexisting branches of U.S. Bank in the region. Three years later, in 1998, BNP and First Hawaiian Inc., the parent of First Hawaiian Bank and Pacific One Bank, created a company under the BancWest Bancorp name to hold Bank of the West and First Hawaiian Bank, with Bank of the West absorbing Pacific One. The creation of BancWest Bancorp caused the now-called BNP Paribas's (BNPP) ownership of the holding company to fall to 45%. BNPP also agreed not to increase its ownership of the bank holding company before November 2001.

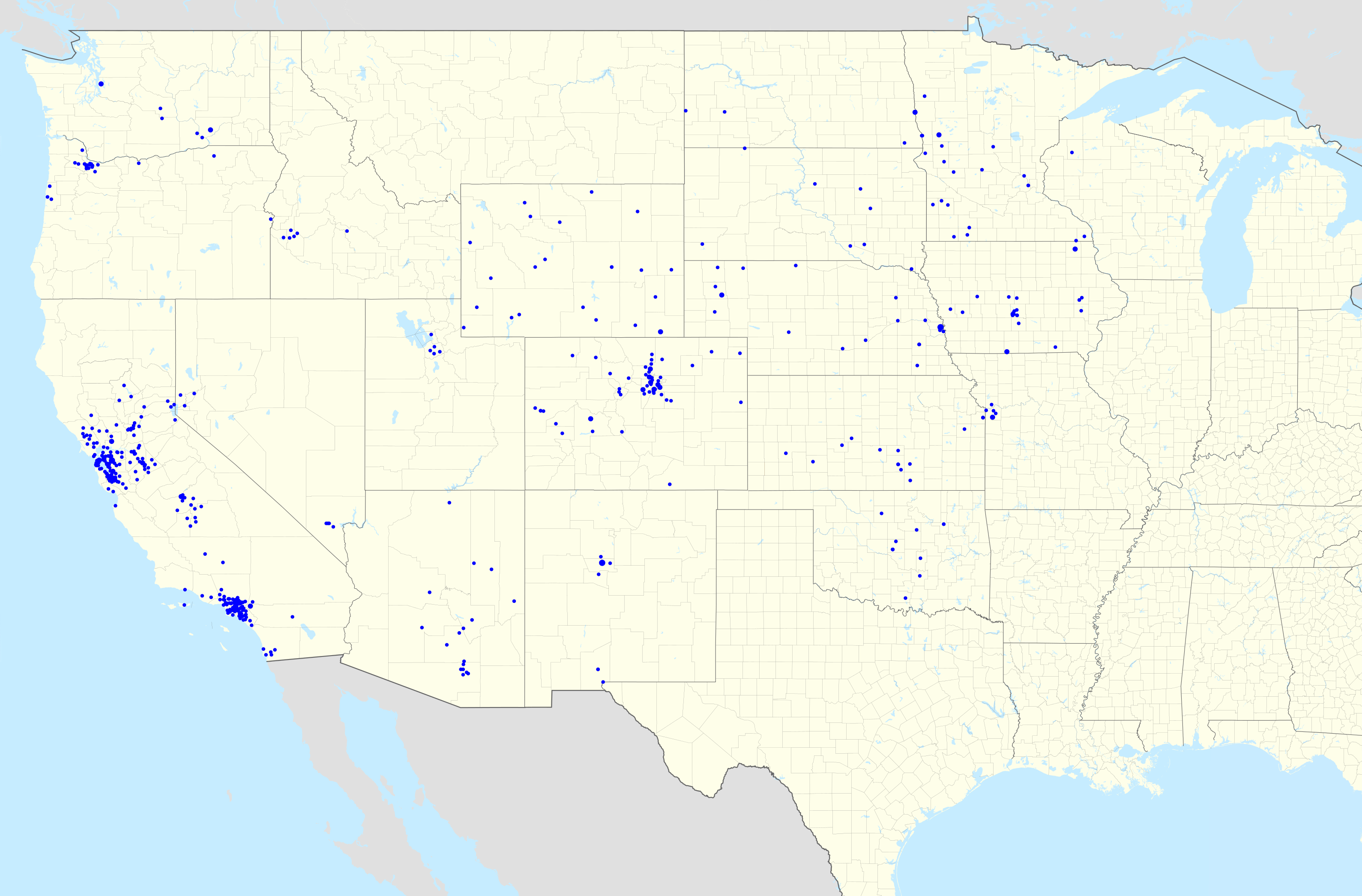
Bank of the West footprint

In 1999, Bank of the West bought Truckee-based Sierra West Bancorp (founded in 1981, 20 branches, merger finalized in 2001). This stock for stock transaction temporarily diluted BNP's ownership of the holding company to 42%.

In 2001, as part of the regulatory approval process with Wells Fargo Banks's acquisition of First Security Corp., Bank of the West acquired 23 First Security branches in New Mexico and seven First Security branches in Nevada to avoid antitrust issues with overlapping Wells Fargo operations. Also in 2001, First Hawaiian Bank bought Union Bank of California's branches in Guam and Saipan. First Hawaiian had established its first branch in Guam in 1970 and its first branch in Saipan in 1997. (Union Bank of California had established its branch in Guam in 1974.) In May 2001, the independent directors of BancWest Bancorp established a special committee that then unanimously voted to accept BNP's offer to acquire the remaining 55% of BancWest Bancorp, making the holding company a wholly owned subsidiary of BNP. The year 2001 concluded with the December purchase by Bank of the West of United California Bank from Japan's UFJ Bank.

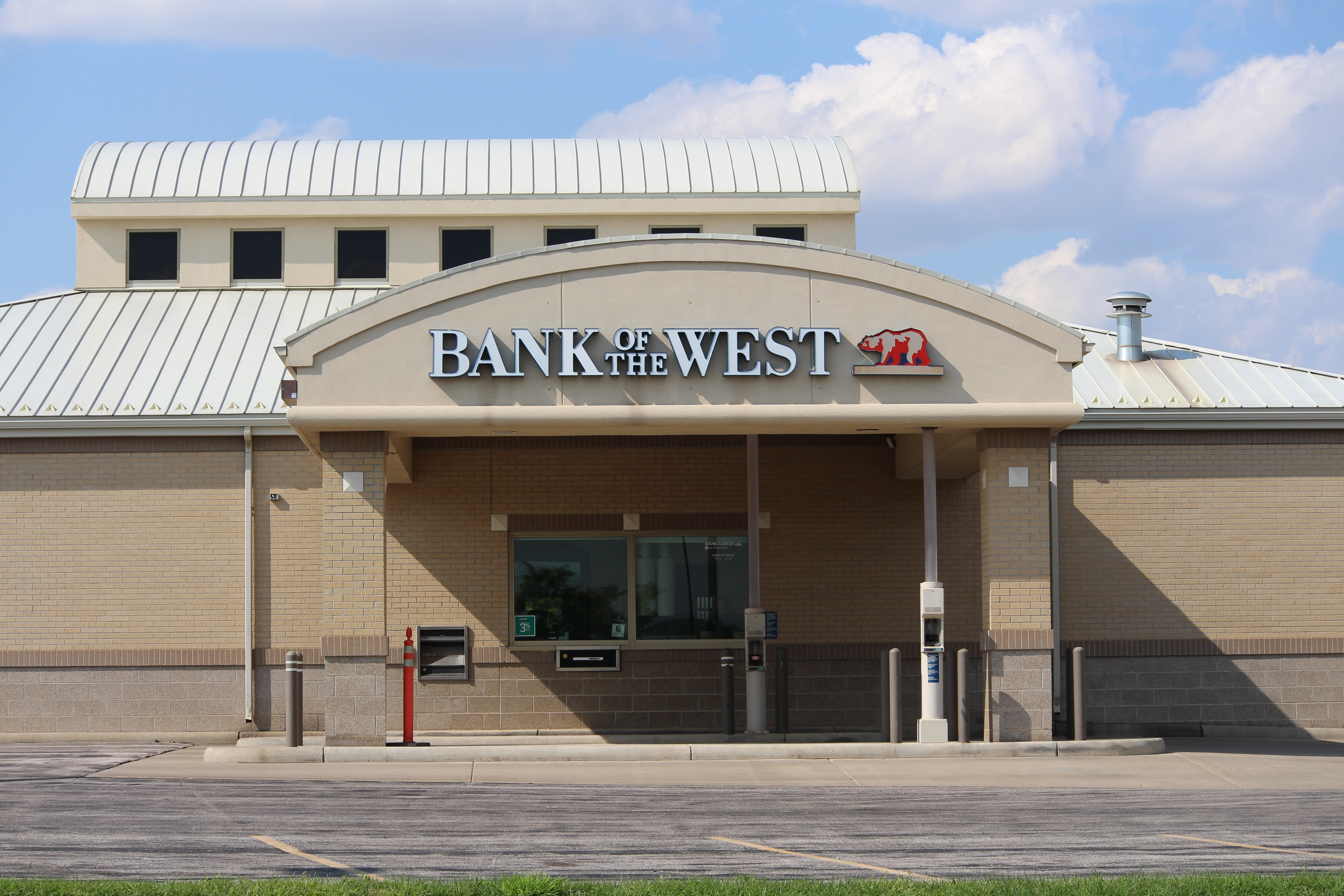
A branch in Gillette, Wyoming

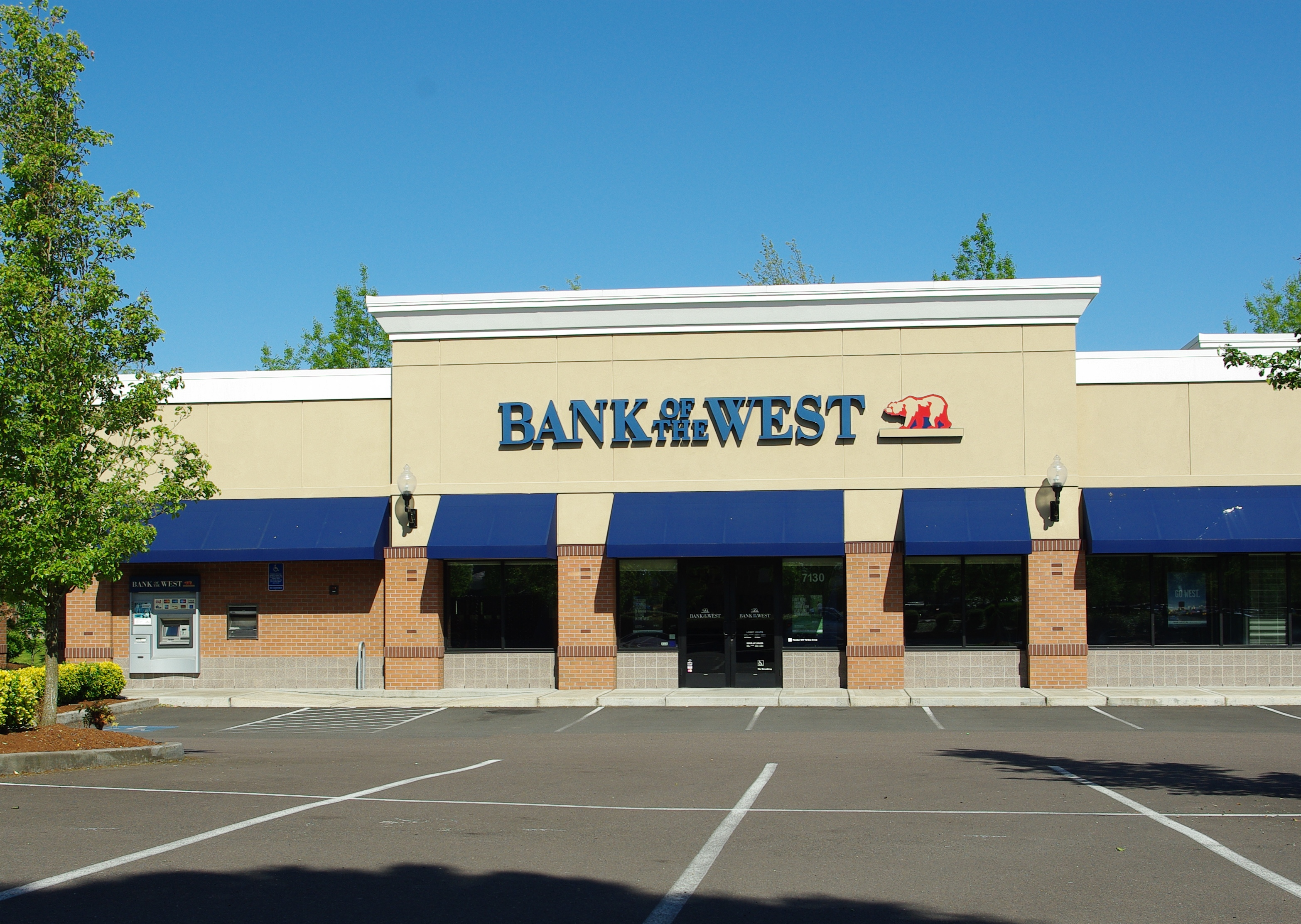
A branch in Hillsboro, Oregon

In March 2004, Bank of the West announced the purchase of Community First Bankshares, a bank holding company that operated Community First National Bank, headquartered in Fargo, North Dakota, which had 155 offices in 12 states: Arizona, California, Colorado, Iowa, Minnesota, Nebraska, New Mexico, North Dakota, South Dakota, Utah, Wisconsin, and Wyoming. Soon after, Bank of the West agreed to buy USDB Bancorp, the parent of Union Safe Deposit Bank. In December 2005, Bank of the West bought Commercial Federal Corporation of Omaha, Nebraska. This merger added offices in Arizona, Colorado, Iowa, Kansas, Missouri, Nebraska, and Oklahoma to Bank of the West.

In January 2006, Bank of the West opened a representative office in Tokyo, Japan, and in September 2007, it opened a representative office in Taipei, Taiwan. As of June 2016, Bank of the West's CEO is Nandita Bakshi.

In 2022, the bank was listed as one of the Best Places to Work for Disability Inclusion by the Disability Equality Index (DEI).

== Acquisition by BMO ==
In December 2021, BNP Paribas agreed to sell Bank of the West to the Canadian banking group BMO. BMO announced plans to merge Bank of the West with its existing U.S. subsidiary BMO Harris Bank, which would at least double BMO's total presence in the United States. BMO's acquisition of Bank of the West completed in February 2023. After the close of business on Friday, September 1, 2023, all Bank of the West accounts and branches were converted over the Labor Day weekend into those of BMO by Tuesday, September 5.

== See also ==
- Lloyds Bank California
