= Hotaling =

Hotaling is a surname, and may refer to:

== People with the surname Hotaling ==
- Anson Parsons Hotaling (1827–1900), American businessman
- Arthur Hotaling (1873–1938), American film director, producer and writer
- Frank Hotaling (1909–1977), American art director
- John Hotaling (1824–1886), American soldier, engineer, and businessman
- Lansing Hotaling (1839–1909), American lawyer and politician
- Norma Hotaling (1951–2008), American women's rights activist
- Pete Hotaling (1856–1928), American center fielder in Major League Baseball
- Richard M. Hotaling (1868–1925), American actor, playwright, politician
- Ted Hotaling (born 1972), American college basketball coach

== Other uses ==
- Hotaling Place, part of Jackson Square Historic District, San Francisco, California
- Hotaling Building in San Francisco, California
  - Hotaling Stables Building in San Francisco, California
  - Hotaling Annex East in San Francisco, California
- Hotaling Annex West in San Francisco, California
