= Fugazi (disambiguation) =

Fugazi may refer to:

- Fugazi, a post-hardcore punk band from Washington, D.C.
  - Fugazi (EP), the debut EP by the band of the same name
- Fugazi (album), a 1984 studio album by the British rock band Marillion, featuring a song also named "Fugazi"
- Fugazi Bank Building, a 1908 historic building in San Francisco, California; commissioned by Giovanni "John" Fugazi (1838–1916)
- Club Fugazi, a theater in the North Beach District of San Francisco, California, the perennial venue of Beach Blanket Babylon
