= Sleepy Hollow, Marin County, California =

Sleepy Hollow
- Census-designated place
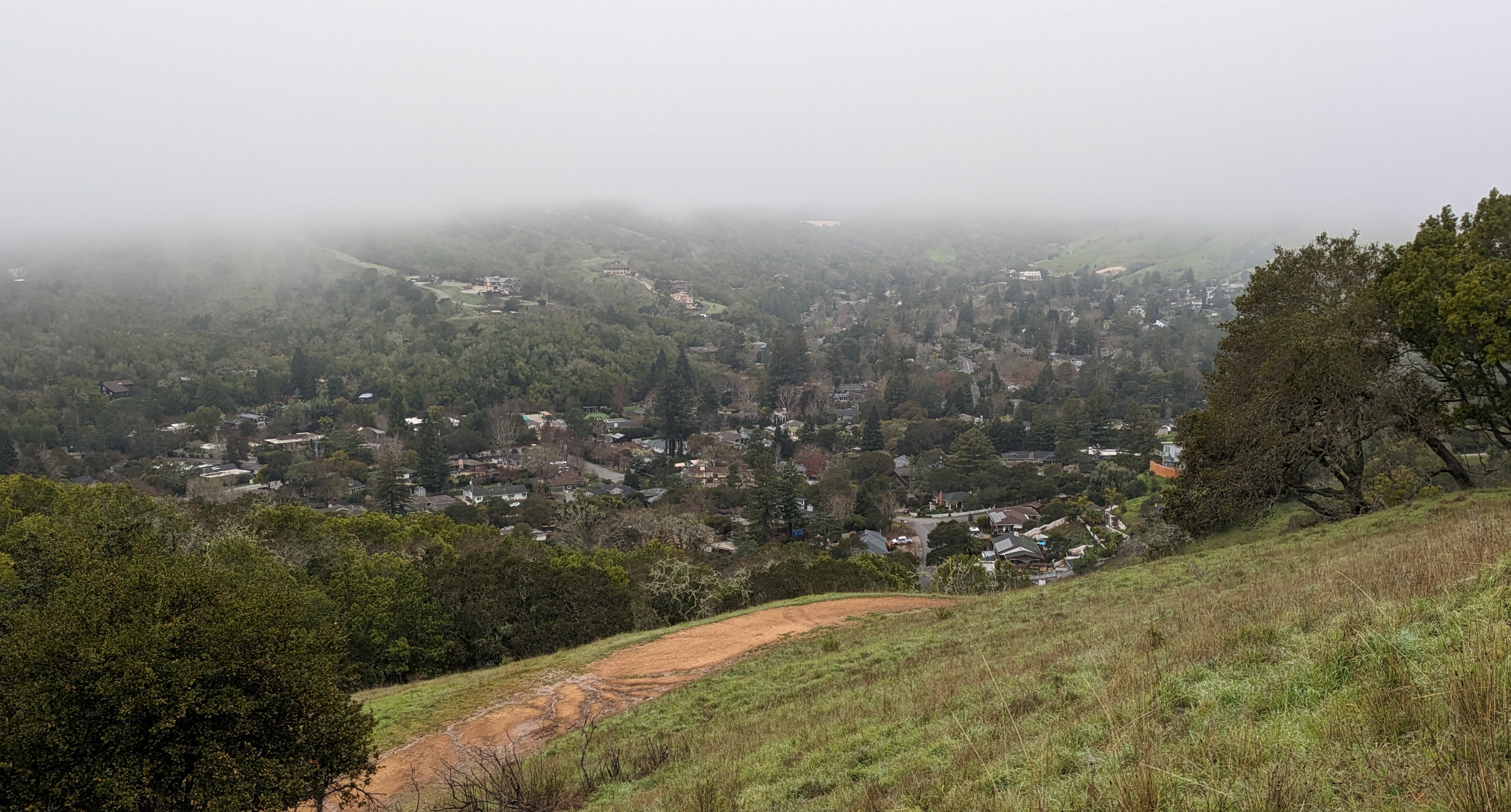

- Location in California Sleepy Hollow (the United States)
- Coordinates: 38°00′38″N 122°35′04″W
- Country: United States
- State: California
- County: Marin County

Area
  - Total: 2.966 sq mi (7.68 km^{2})
  - Land: 2.966 sq mi (7.68 km^{2})
  - Water: 0 sq mi (0 km^{2}) 0%
- Elevation: 177 ft (54 m)

Population (2020)
  - Total: 2,401
  - Density: 809.5/sq mi (312.6/km^{2})
- Time zone: UTC-8 (Pacific (PST))
  - Summer (DST): UTC-7 (PDT)
- ZIP Code: 94960
- Area codes: 415/628
- GNIS feature IDs: 1800792; 2628818
- FIPS Code: 06-72184

Sleepy Hollow is a census-designated place in Marin County, California, United States. It is located 7 miles (11 km) south of downtown Novato at an elevation of 177 feet (54 m). Its population as of the 2020 census was 2,401.

== History ==
In 1838, Domingo Sais received a land grant from General Mariano Vallejo known as Cañada de Herrera, which consisted of 6,659 acres (2,695 ha) covering what is now Sleepy Hollow, Fairfax and segments of San Anselmo. In the 1850s, Sais leased the majority of the land that is now Sleepy Hollow to Harvey Butterfield. Butterfield started a dairy farm on the land, and the long, winding 2-mile trail that is still to this day the only way in and out of the community became known as "Butterfield's Road". The next person to acquire the land was a man named Peter Austin who was responsible for planting the multitude of poplar and eucalyptus trees that now line the road.

Due to foreclosure, Austin was forced to sell 1,900 acres (770 ha) of land to A. P. Hotaling and his family, a millionaire businessman from San Francisco. His son, Richard M. Hotaling built in 1900 a lavish mansion (known as the Hotaling Mansion) at the end of the two-mile road, and named it "Sleepy Hollow" in honor of "The Legend of Sleepy Hollow", a famous short story written by their friend, author Washington Irving. The Hotalings threw many elaborate parties for hundreds of guests, and maintained a herd of Holstein cattle from Holland. The Hotaling family sold the property in 1925, and returned to San Francisco.

The next owner of the mansion was Sigmund Herzog, who founded a dairy farm on the property. Later a Chicago syndicate bought the land and attempted to create a luxury hotel complete with golf course, pool, and private man-made lake, but this idea quickly fell through due to the stock market crash prior to the Great Depression.

In the 1930s, Sleepy Hollow boasted the western United States' only "play as you go" 18-hole golf course that became the second largest in the country. In 1939, the land was given to the U.S. Army in order to secretly store ammunition for World War II until the war was over. In 1946, A.G. Raisch bought the mansion and an additional 500 acres. Following the tradition, Raisch threw many luxurious parties for hundreds of guests. He eventually left the estate and it remained unoccupied for several years until it spontaneously caught on fire. The majority of the house burned down, leaving only a wall and a set of steps that still stand today.

Sleepy Hollow became a residential area due to the opening of Lang Realty shortly after World War II. In 1966 the Dominican Order of the Catholic Church bought the "Sleepy Hollow" mansion and opened the San Domenico School for Girls. Presently, San Domenico School is a private, co-ed K-12 day school, with boarding in the high school for girls only.

== Geography ==
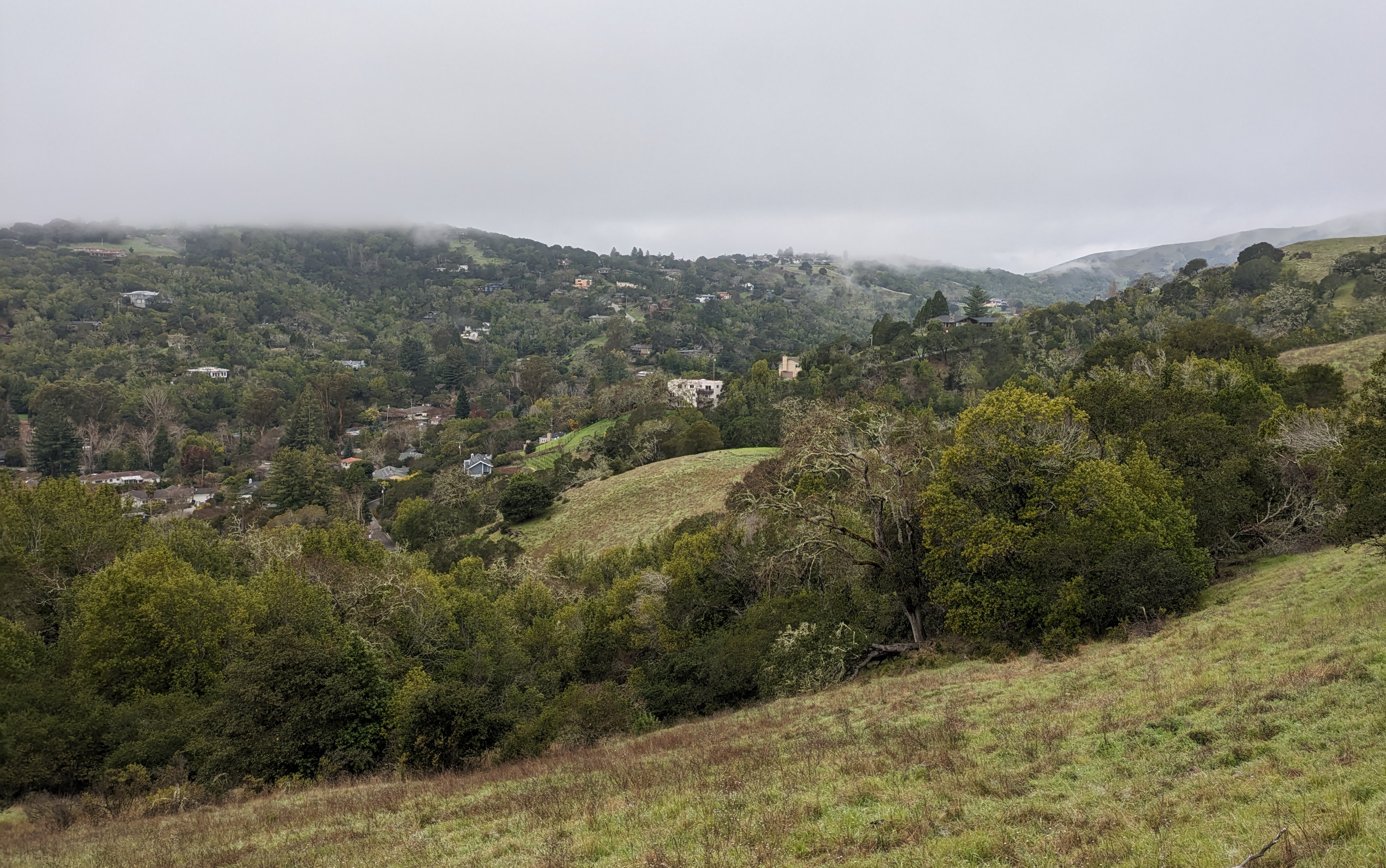
Sleepy Hollow

Sleepy Hollow is in east-central Marin County and is bordered to the south by the town of San Anselmo. The Terra Linda district of San Rafael lies to the east. Though no roads directly connect Sleepy Hollow with Terra Linda, hiking trails do.

Butterfield Road, Sleepy Hollow's main street, is accessed from Sir Francis Drake Boulevard, a major east–west road in Marin County. The community is in ZIP code 94960 and area codes 415 and 628.

Lucas Valley-Marinwood lies to the north of Sleepy Hollow, but there are no roads directly connecting the two unincorporated communities.

According to the United States Census Bureau the CDP covers an area of 2.97 square miles (7.69 km^{2}), all land.

== Demographics ==
Historical population
Census	Pop.	Note	%±
2010	2,384		—
2020	2,401		0.7%
U.S. Decennial Census; 1860–1870 1880-1890; 1900 1910 1920; 1930 1940 1950; 1960 1970 1980; 1990 2000 2010; 2020

Sleepy Hollow first appeared as a census-designated place in the 2010 United States census.

=== Racial and ethnic composition ===
Sleepy Hollow CDP, California – Racial and ethnic composition Note: the US Census treats Hispanic/Latino as an ethnic category. This table excludes Latinos from the racial categories and assigns them to a separate category. Hispanics/Latinos may be of any race.
Race / Ethnicity (NH = Non-Hispanic)	Pop 2010	Pop 2020	% 2010	% 2020
White alone (NH)	2,111	2,013	88.55%	83.84%
Black or African American alone (NH)	14	8	0.59%	0.33%
Native American or Alaska Native alone (NH)	8	0	0.34%	0.00%
Asian alone (NH)	111	88	4.66%	3.67%
Native Hawaiian or Pacific Islander alone (NH)	5	0	0.21%	0.00%
Other race alone (NH)	5	12	0.21%	0.50%
Mixed race or Multiracial (NH)	61	136	2.56%	5.66%
Hispanic or Latino (any race)	69	144	2.89%	6.00%
Total	2,384	2,401	100.00%	100.00%

=== 2020 census ===
The 2020 United States census reported that Sleepy Hollow had a population of 2,401. The population density was 809.5 inhabitants per square mile (312.5/km^{2}). The racial makeup of Sleepy Hollow was 85.2% White, 0.5% African American, 0.0% Native American, 3.7% Asian, 0.0% Pacific Islander, 0.8% from other races, and 9.8% from two or more races. Hispanic or Latino of any race were 6.0% of the population.

The census reported that 99.2% of the population lived in households, 0.8% lived in non-institutionalized group quarters, and no one was institutionalized.

There were 832 households, out of which 39.5% included children under the age of 18, 72.6% were married-couple households, 2.9% were cohabiting couple households, 16.2% had a female householder with no partner present, and 8.3% had a male householder with no partner present. 13.7% of households were one person, and 9.4% were one person aged 65 or older. The average household size was 2.86. There were 687 families (82.6% of all households).

The age distribution was 24.4% under the age of 18, 6.5% aged 18 to 24, 11.0% aged 25 to 44, 33.4% aged 45 to 64, and 24.7% who were 65 years of age or older. The median age was 50.0 years. For every 100 females, there were 95.2 males.

There were 868 housing units at an average density of 292.7 units per square mile (113.0 units/km^{2}), of which 832 (95.9%) were occupied. Of these, 88.9% were owner-occupied, and 11.1% were occupied by renters.

== Politics ==
In the state legislature, Sleepy Hollow is in the 2nd senatorial district, represented by Democrat Mike McGuire, and in the 12th Assembly district, represented by Democrat Damon Connolly.

Federally, Sleepy Hollow is in California's 2nd congressional district, represented by Democrat Jared Huffman.

== Education ==
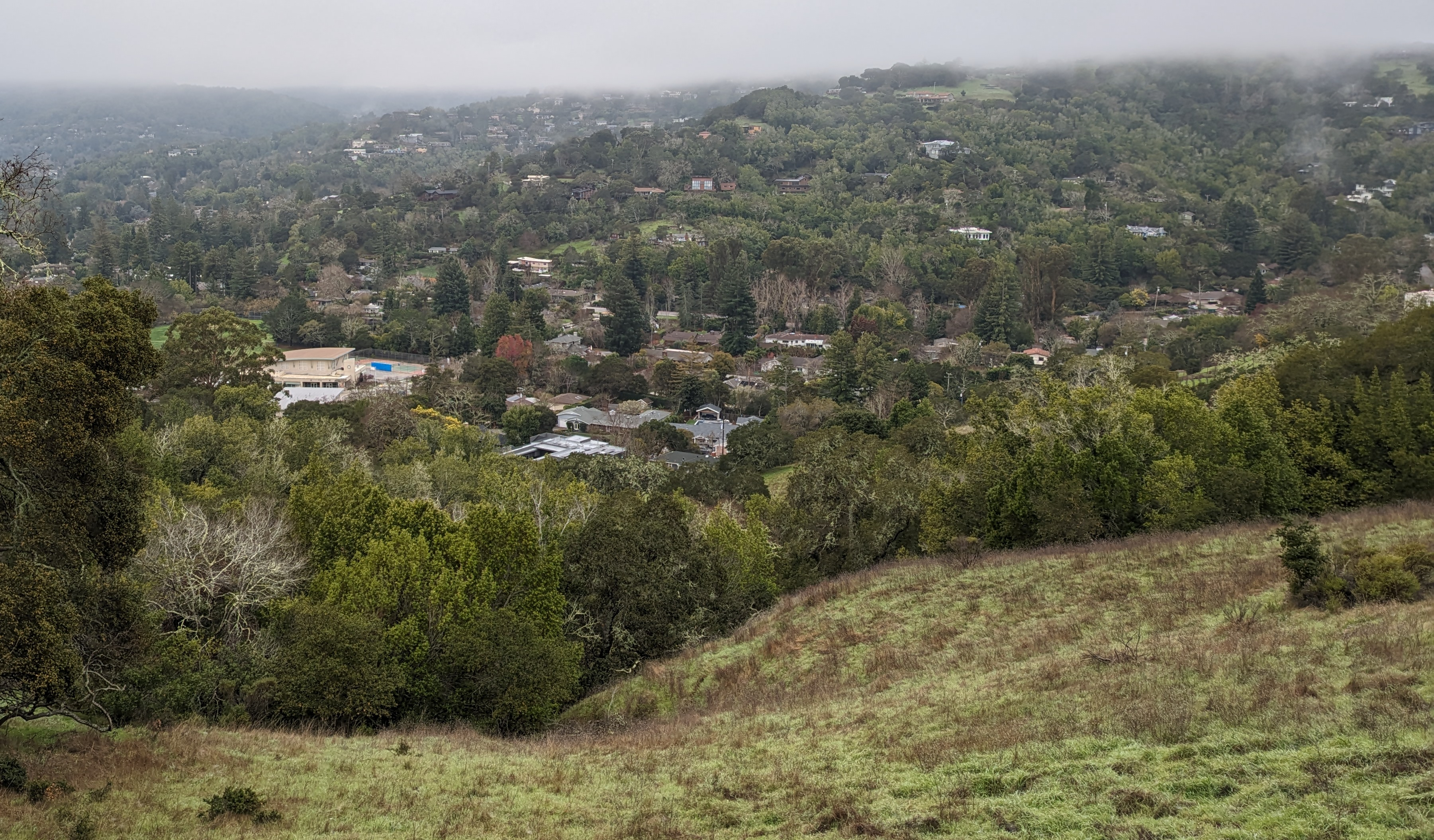
View of Sleepy Hollow with Hidden Valley Elementary School visible (beige building on the left)

Sleepy Hollow is in the Ross Valley Elementary School District and the Tamalpais Union High School District.
