= Margaret Hosmer =

Margaret Kerr Hosmer (December 1, 1830 – February 3, 1897) was an American writer and novelist who primarily wrote for young readers.

Hosmer was born and attended school in Philadelphia, Pennsylvania, and later moved to San Francisco where she served a principal of a public school, and also at one point edited The Golden Era with Bret Harte. She married Granville Hosmer in 1853. She returned to Philadelphia in 1860, and was back to San Francisco in 1864. She died from pneumonia in Philadelphia in February 1897.

== Bibliography ==
Hosmer contributed to magazines, published novels, and wrote over 25 books for young readers. She also published serials under the name Grace Thornton.

- The Morrisons (1863)
- Blance Gilroy (1864)
- Ten Years of a Lifetime (1866)
- Little Rosie series (1869)
- Rich and Poor (1870)
- The Sin of the Father (1872)
- A Rough Boy's Story (1873)
