= Melvin Belli =

American lawyer (1907–1996)

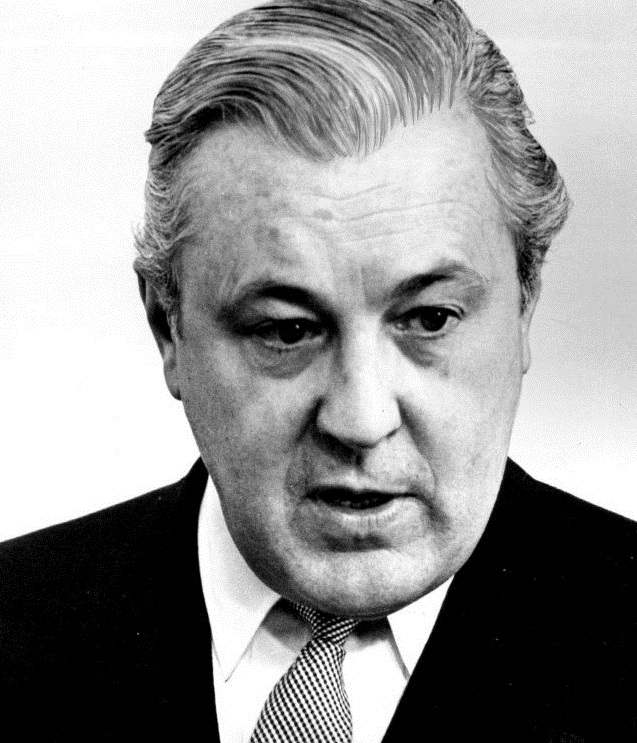
- Belli in 1967
- Born: Melvin Mouron Belli; July 29, 1907; Sonora, California, U.S.
- Died: July 9, 1996 (aged 88); San Francisco, California, U.S.
- Occupations: Lawyer, author
- Spouses: Elizabeth Ballantine (m. 1933; div. 1951) Toni Nichols (m. 1951; div. 1954) Joy Maybelle Turney (m. 1956; div. 1965) Patricia Montandon (m. 1966; div. 1966) Lia Georgia Triff (m. 1972; div. 1991) Nancy Ho (m. 1996)
- Children: 6

Melvin Mouron Belli (/ˈbɛlaɪ/ BEL-eye; July 29, 1907 – July 9, 1996) was an American lawyer and writer known as "The King of Torts" and by insurance companies as "Melvin Bellicose". He had many celebrity clients, including Zsa Zsa Gabor, Errol Flynn, Chuck Berry, Muhammad Ali, The Rolling Stones, Jim Bakker and Tammy Faye Bakker, Martha Mitchell, Maureen Connolly, Lana Turner, Tony Curtis, and Mae West. During his legal career, he won over $600 million in damages for his clients. He was also the attorney for Jack Ruby, who shot Lee Harvey Oswald days after the assassination of President John F. Kennedy.

== Early life ==
Belli was born in the California Gold Rush town of Sonora, California, in the Sierra Nevada foothills. His parents were of Italian ancestry from Switzerland. His grandmother, Anna Mouron, was the first female pharmacist in California. By the 1920s, the family had moved to the Central Valley city of Stockton, California, where Belli attended the now-defunct Stockton High School.

Belli graduated from the University of California, Berkeley, in 1929. After traveling around the world, he obtained his law degree from the UC Berkeley School of Law in 1933.

== Career ==
Following his admission to the California bar, his first job was posing as a hobo for the Works Progress Administration and riding the rails to observe the Depression's impact on the country's vagrant population.

His first major legal victory came shortly after graduation, in a personal injury lawsuit representing an injured cable car gripman. Over insurance lawyers' objections, Belli brought a model of a cable car intersection, and the gear box and chain involved in the accident, to demonstrate to jurors exactly what had happened.

Besides his personal injury cases, which earned for him his byname "King of Torts," Belli was instrumental in setting up some of the foundations of modern consumer rights law, arguing several cases in the 1940s and 1950s that formed the basis for later lawsuits and landmark litigation by Ralph Nader.

In Escola v. Coca-Cola Bottling Co. (1944), where a restaurant waitress from Merced, California, was injured by an exploding Coca-Cola bottle, Belli argued that all products have an implied warranty, that it is to be foreseen that products will be used by a long chain of people and not just the direct recipient of the manufactured product, and that negligence by a defendant need not be proven if the defendant's product is defective. Thus was born the doctrine of strict liability in product defect causes of action.

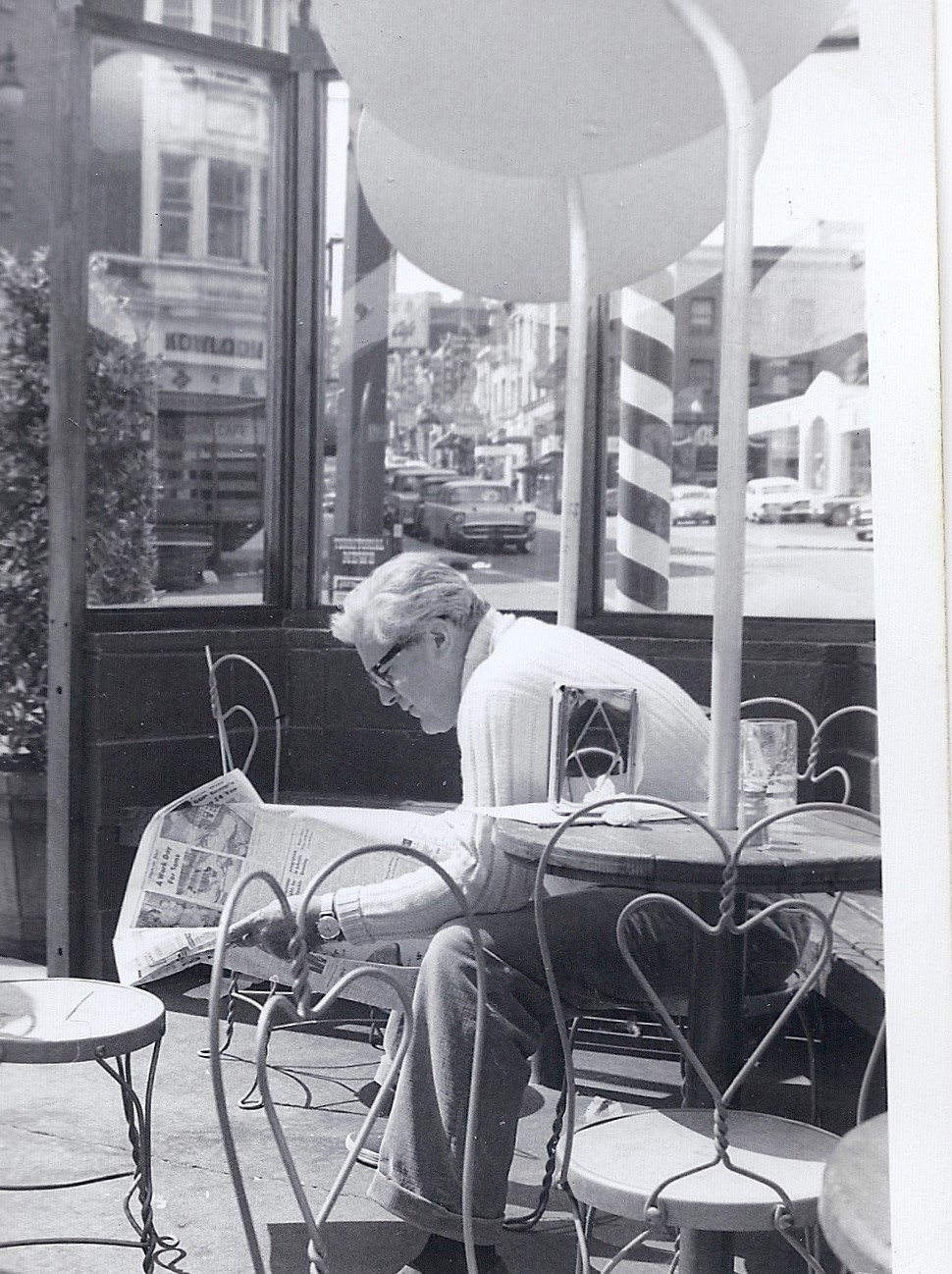
Belli in Clown Alley, 1964

In his book Ready for the Plaintiff, Belli notes legal cases of negligence cited by personal-injury attorneys, like himself, to win in court. Examples include a colleague in Florida, who showed how a builder violated a building code in Miami Beach concerning the use of wooden shims in construction of outside walls, forbidden by the municipal code because of the effect of the ocean salt and air. The facing was a slab of vitreous marble, whose adhesion was weakened by the climate; it fell off the side of the building and injured a passerby, who sued the builder.

In the 1960s, Belli was among the leading members of the California plaintiffs bar who helped establish the California Trial Lawyers Association, which in the mid-1990s was renamed the Consumer Attorneys of California. The organization was established to help set standards and foment on-going legal education to help consumers have a better chance in court against the powerful legal teams amassed by the insurance companies and big corporations that typically were the defendants in accident, personal injury and other consumer lawsuits.

After winning a court case, Belli would raise a Jolly Roger flag over his office building in the Barbary Coast district of San Francisco (which Belli claimed had been a Gold Rush-era brothel) and fire a cannon, mounted on his office roof, to announce the victory and the impending party. This former law office was at the Belli Building in the Jackson Square neighborhood of San Francisco.

Among Belli's clientele was the mobster Mickey Cohen, the boss of the Cohen crime family, who was a friend of Belli's. He referred to Cohen as a "gentleman of great courtliness and charm". Cohen served as a babysitter for Belli's son Caesar, and at one point he loaned Cohen $3000. In 1958 Cohen was indicted for assaulting a federal officer, with Belli defending him. The result was a jury deadlock. In 1959 he represented Cohen's girlfriend, the stripper Candy Barr, after she was arrested on possession of marijuana. Against Belli's advice, Cohen decided to receive his money as "gifts" with the intention that he would not have to declare it as an income. He was convicted of tax evasion in 1962. While imprisoned in Atlanta, Cohen was attacked with a pipe. Belli filed a damage suit against the government and won. When Belli had a squabble with the American Bar Association (ABA), he decided to get them back by inviting Cohen, branded as Professor Julian O'Brien of Harvard, to deliver a seminar on tax law at the ABA's Miami convention at the same time as he was under indictment for tax evasion. Cohen's talk was unserious and concluded with "My parting advice to you guys is, 'Pay your taxes'".

In his best-known case, Belli represented Jack Ruby, after Ruby shot and killed Lee Harvey Oswald. Belli tried to argue that Ruby was mentally ill and employed the insanity defense. Belli told the press that "Ruby is an intense, emotional man. Talking to him, the hair rose on the hackles of my neck. I felt horror, revulsion, sadness". Ruby was uncomfortable with Belli's defense strategy, which included Ruby not testifying at all during the trial. Ruby said he would have liked to testify but that "Mr. Belli knows better, I guess". This defense failed and Ruby was convicted of "murder with malice", receiving a death sentence. When the verdict was read out Belli said to Ruby "Don't worry, Jack, we'll appeal this to a court outside Dallas". However Belli was fired by Ruby and his family before he could do so. In 1964 he published a memoir of the trial, co-written with Maurice C. Carroll, entitled Dallas Justice: The Real Story of Jack Ruby and His Trial. In October 1964 he debated Mark Lane, who disputed that Oswald alone killed Kennedy, at the Manhattan Center.

In 1969 a man called San Francisco police, identifying himself as the serial killer known only as The Zodiac, and agreed to call talk show host Jim Dunbar on Dunbar's morning television talk show A.M. San Francisco if either Belli or attorney F. Lee Bailey were present on air. The police contacted Belli and Dunbar to arrange this in the hopes of capturing the individual. As promised, the suspect called, spoke a few words, and then hung up, repeating this activity 54 times over the next two hours. Belli received a letter from the Zodiac that same year.

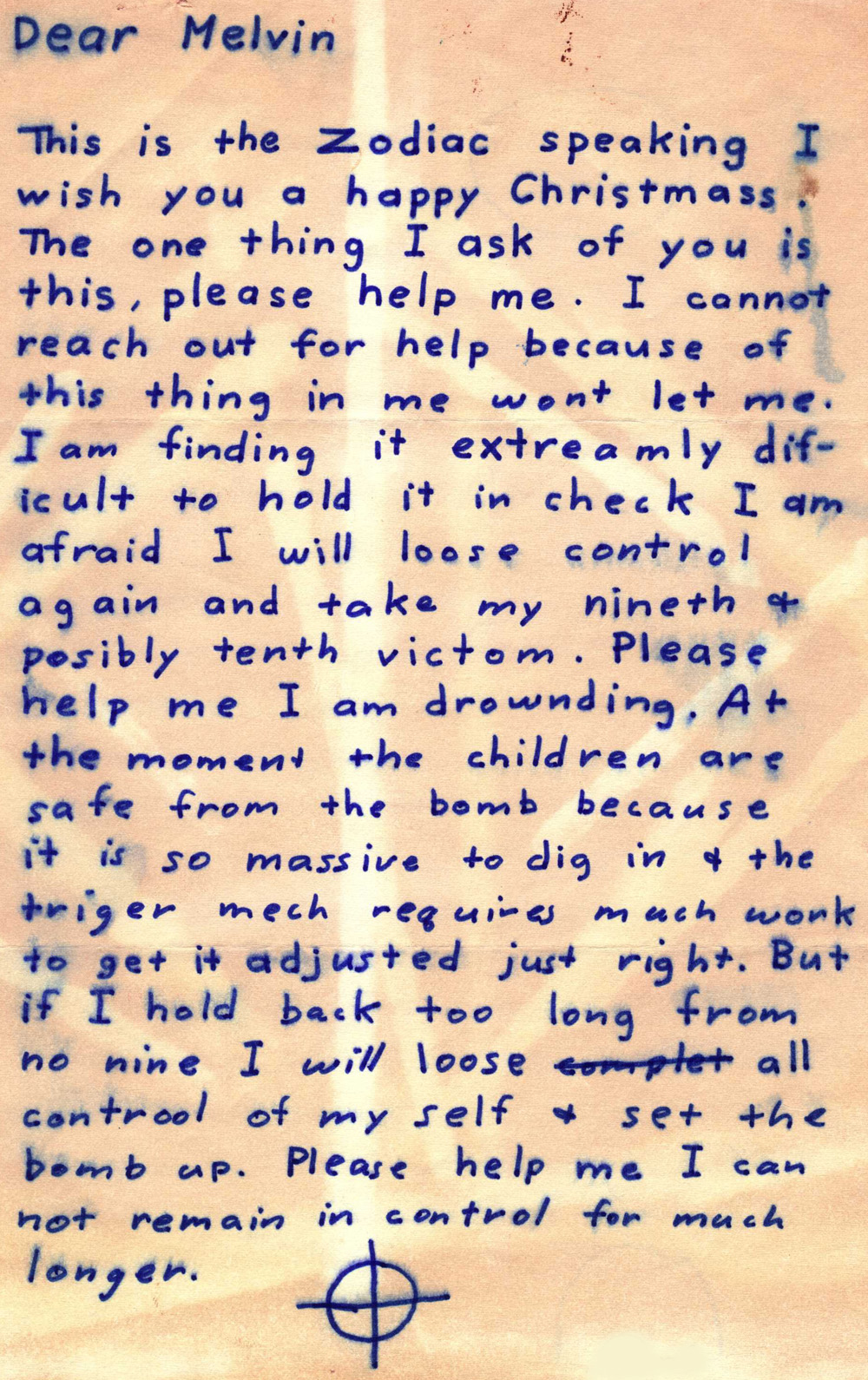
Zodiac letter received by Belli

In 1971 he represented the infamous mob lawyer Frank Ragano in his libel suit against Time magazine; Belli lost the case. Time had published an article labelling Ragano as a "top Cosa Nostra hoodlum" after he attended a dinner in the wake of the La Stella Restaurant meeting in 1966.

Belli's firm filed for bankruptcy protection in December 1995. Belli was representing 800 women in a class action lawsuit against breast implant manufacturer Dow Corning. Belli won the lawsuit, but when Dow Corning declared bankruptcy, Belli had no way to recover the $5 million his firm had advanced to doctors and expert witnesses.

== In media ==
Belli was the executive producer of Tokyo File 212 (1951), Hollywood's first film to be shot entirely in Japan. It featured Florence Marly and Robert Peyton in key roles.

Belli enjoyed his frequent television and movie appearances; in 1965, he told Alex Haley, interviewing him for Playboy, that he "might have been an actor" if he had not become an attorney.

Belli appeared in "And the Children Shall Lead", a 1968 episode of the original Star Trek series. In it he appears as "Gorgan, the Friendly Angel", an evil being who corrupts a group of children, one of whom was played by his son Caesar. In April 1968 he appeared in a CBS news special, The Trial Lawyer, alongside his fellow lawyers Percy Foreman, F. Lee Bailey, and Edward Bennett Williams, where they discussed the merits and demerits of trial by jury.

He appeared in the Albert and David Maysles documentary Gimme Shelter (1970), which featured his representation and facilitation of The Rolling Stones' staging of the disastrous December 6, 1969, Altamont Free Concert.

Belli made an attempt to net the role of Vito Corleone in Francis Ford Coppola's The Godfather (1972), with the part ultimately going to Marlon Brando. In October 1973 he made an appearance on The Dick Cavett Show with Jimmy Hoffa and Charles Ashman.

In 1986 he played a criminal defense lawyer in an episode of the TV series Hunter titled "True Confessions". He was interviewed for the 1988 Jack Anderson documentary American Expose: Who Killed JFK?.

Belli was played by Brian Cox in the 2007 film Zodiac in the scene that depicted Belli's conversation with the Zodiac suspect on A.M. San Francisco.

Big Black guitarist Santiago Durango used Belli's name as a pseudonym in the credits of the last Big Black studio album, Songs About Fucking, as a nod to the fact that Durango was going to attend law school after Big Black disbanded.

== Author ==
Belli was the author of several books, including the six-volume Modern Trials (written between 1954 and 1960) which has become a classic textbook on the demonstrative method of presenting evidence. Belli's unprecedented — and some thought undignified — use of graphic evidence and expert witnesses later became common courtroom practice. His autobiography My Life on Trial is an account of his life and the noteworthy events he was involved in during his career. He also wrote the introduction to 847.0 The Whiplash Injury by L. Ted Frigard, D.C. published in 1970. Dr. Frigard had helped Belli with his pain through chiropractic care. With John Carlova, Belli also wrote the book "Belli For Your Malpractice Defense" to advise doctors how to avoid legal problems.

== Personal life ==
Belli was married six times and divorced five. His marriage to his fifth wife, the former Lia Georgia Triff, ended with a scandalous and acrimonious divorce proceeding in 1991. Belli accused his ex-wife of having an affair with archbishop Desmond Tutu and of throwing one of his dogs off the Golden Gate Bridge. He was fined $1,000 for repeatedly calling her "El Trampo". At one point, Belli was ejected from the courtroom after accusing the judge of sleeping with his former wife's lawyer. He was ultimately compelled to pay her an estimated $15 million. She later married Prince Paul of Romania. Belli married his sixth wife, Nancy Ho, on March 29, 1996. His youngest child, Melia, from fifth wife Lia, became an art history scholar, and is currently an assistant professor of Asian art history at the University of Texas at Arlington.

== Death ==
Belli died of complications from pancreatic cancer at his home in San Francisco on July 9, 1996, aged 88. His death came suddenly, and in the presence of his wife Nancy. The New York Times' quoted his publicist Edward Lozzi: "He was sitting; he just stopped breathing". At the time of his death, he had three sons, three daughters, twelve grandchildren, and two dogs. He was remembered as, "an impresario of a lawyer who pioneered new techniques and huge settlements in personal injury cases and who defended Jack Ruby, the man who killed Lee Harvey Oswald." He is buried in Odd Fellows Cemetery in Sonora, California, his birthplace. He is remembered as one of the "most famous lawyers in America."

== Bibliography ==
- 1950, The Voice of Modern Trials
- 1951, The Adequate Award
- 1952, The More Adequate Award
- 1952, The More Adequate Award and the Flying Saucers
- 1954, Modern Trials (6 volumes)
- 1955, The Use of Demonstrative Evidence in Achieving the More Adequate Award
- 1955, Medical Malpractice
- 1956, Blood Money Ready for the Plaintiff
- 1956, Ready for the Plaintiff: A Story of Personal Injury Law
- 1959, Modern Damages (6 volumes)
- 1960, Belli Looks at Life and Law in Japan
- 1963, Belli Looks at Life and Law in Russia
- 1964, Dallas Justice: The Real Story of Jack Ruby And His Trial
- 1967, Trial Tactics
- 1968, Criminal Law
- 1968, The Law Revolt: A Summary of Trends in Modern Criminal and Civil Law
- 1968, The Law Revolution
- 1971, Angela: A Revealing Close-Up of the Woman And the Trial
- 1976, My Life on Trial: An Autobiography
- 1983, The Belli Files
- 1986, Everybody's Guide to the Law (co-author Allen P. Wilkinson)

== Filmography (as actor) ==
- 1968, Star Trek (as Gorgan in the episode "And the Children Shall Lead")
- 1968, Wild in the Streets (as himself)
- 1970, Gimme Shelter (as himself)
- 1972, Arnie (TV Series, as Jonathan Berrenger, lawyer)
- 1973, Ground Zero (a.k.a. The Golden Gate Is Ground Zero)
- 1978, Lady of the House (TV, as Mayor Jim of San Francisco)
- 1979, Whodunnit? (TV series, as himself)
- 1984, Guilty or Innocent (TV series, as himself)
- 1988, Hunter (TV series, as himself in the episode "True Confessions")
- 1991, Murder, She Wrote (TV series, as Judge Harley in the episode "From the Horse's Mouth")
- 2000, American Justice, "Divorce Wars" (TV series) posthumously
