= And the Children Shall Lead =

- Star Trek: The Original Series episode
- Episode no.: Season 3 Episode 4
- Directed by: Marvin J. Chomsky
- Written by: Edward J. Lakso
- Cinematography by: Jerry Finnerman
- Production code: 060
- Original air date: October 11, 1968

Guest appearances
- Melvin Belli – Gorgan; Caesar Belli – Steve; Craig Huxley – Tommy Starnes; James Wellman – Professor Starnes; Pamelyn Ferdin – Mary; Mark Robert Brown – Don; Brian Tochi – Ray; Lou Elias – 1st Technician; Jay D. Jones – 2nd Technician; Paul Baxley – Security Guard; Dick Dial – Security Guard; Eddie Paskey – Lt. Leslie; Frank da Vinci – Transporter Operator; William Blackburn – Lt. Hadley; Roger Holloway – Lt. Lemli

Episode chronology
| ← Previous "The Paradise Syndrome" | Next → "Is There in Truth No Beauty?" |
- Star Trek: The Original Series season 3

"And the Children Shall Lead" is the fourth episode of the third season of the American science fiction television series Star Trek. Written by Edward J. Lakso and directed by Marvin Chomsky, it was first broadcast on October 11, 1968.

In the episode, the crew of the Enterprise find children with great and sinister powers at their disposal.

== Plot ==
The Federation starship Enterprise arrives at the planet Triacus. Captain Kirk, Dr. McCoy, and First Officer Spock beam down in time to witness the death of Professor Starnes, the leader of a scientific expedition team. The other members of the expedition, apart from their five seemingly unconcerned children who play and chant, seem to have died at their own hands, dominated by a mysterious fear.

The crew bring the children back to the Enterprise, where McCoy evaluates them and determines that they are suffering from lacunar amnesia, unaware of what happened to their parents and unable to grieve. However, when left unattended in one of the ship's rooms, the children chant an evocation and summon a glowing humanoid named Gorgan. He advises them to take control of the crew in order to get to Marcus XII, his preferred destination, where he will dominate millions more followers and conquer the galaxy. The eldest child, Tommy, uses mental powers Gorgan has bestowed on the children to trick the crew into steering the ship while presenting illusions that make them think they are still in orbit above Triacus.

Upon reviewing a troubling expedition film recorded by Starnes, Spock, McCoy, and Kirk return to the bridge to find the children and Gorgan fully in control of the crew through illusion and fear. Unable to break their hold on the crew, Spock observes that the children are merely possessed by Gorgan, who must be the evil embodiment of an ancient group of space-warring marauders released by Starnes's archaeological survey.

Believing they can break the hold Gorgan has on the children, Spock plays back footage showing the children happy with their parents, who are then shown to be dead. As the children realize what has happened, they break down emotionally and Gorgan's appearance begins to deteriorate as he shouts at the children but fails to retain their loyalty. With the children's powers gone, the crew regains control and Kirk orders a course for Starbase 4 while they take care to comfort the children.

== Production ==
The episode was filmed in July 1968.

Child actor Craig Hundley, who played Tommy, became a composer and inventor under the name Craig Huxley. His Blaster Beam, an 18-foot (5.5 m) long aluminum bar strung with piano wire and played using artillery shells, would appear on Jerry Goldsmith's soundtrack for the first Star Trek film, as well as James Horner's Star Trek II and Star Trek III soundtracks. Huxley also composed the piece "Genesis Project" for the "Project Genesis" briefing video in Star Trek II.

Ferdin (who played Mary) and Tochi (who played Ray) would later reunite on Space Academy, a short-lived series that aired from 1977 to 1979 on CBS.

The somewhat bizarre casting choice for Gorgan was Melvin Belli, a personal injury attorney known as "The King of Torts." His son Caesar played one of the children.

During a climactic scene on the bridge, the oldest child, Tommy Starnes (played by Craig Hundley), casts a spell to make Captain Kirk's voice unintelligible, so as to render him unable to give orders to his crew. To accomplish this effect in the production of the show, some of William Shatner's dialogue was recorded and then played back in reverse. When the audio is reversed in this segment of the finished soundtrack, Shatner can be heard clearly for the majority of the segment to state:

"Remove Lt. Uhura and Mr. Spock from the bridge. Confine them to quarters.
Did you hear me?
Take Mr. Sulu to his quarters. He is relieved of duty.
Remove Lt. Uhura and Mr. Spock from the bridge. Confine [unintelligible]
Take Mr. Sulu to his quarters
[unintelligible] Mr. Spock from the bridge. Confine them to quarters
Mr. Leslie, take Mr. Sulu to his quarters"

Dave Tilotta performs a script analysis on this episode, comparing the original script to what was filmed and aired. He observed a deleted scene with Sulu and words to the children's incantations among other things.

== Reception ==
This episode was reportedly considered the worst episode in the Star Trek canon by Spock actor Leonard Nimoy, as of 1986.

A 1995 newspaper fan vote for worst episode of the series nominated this episode and "A Piece of the Action".

While the general fan consensus was that this was one of the poorer third-season episodes, and that Captain Kirk's "brusque, exaggeratedly authoritarian and at times unmistakably hostile attitude" towards the titular children undermined both the moral and the plot, Richard Keller of TV Squad listed Gorgan as the tenth scariest television character.

In 2016, CNET ranked this episode as the 7th worst episode of all Star Trek, based on rankings between an audience and discussion hosts at a 50th anniversary Star Trek convention in Las Vegas.

In 2017, Den of Geek ranked this episode as the 3rd worst Star Trek episode of the original series.

In 2019 the Australian Broadcasting Corporation found, when charting the average IMDb ratings for all episodes of all the Star Trek series, that "And the Children Shall Lead ..." had the lowest of all Original Series ratings.

In 2020, Den of Geek ranked this episode as the 11th most scary episode of all Star Trek franchise television episodes.

== References in other media ==
In the 2007 film, Zodiac, during the scene in which the killer is invited to call in to a television program and speak with Melvin Belli (Brian Cox), the newsman asks about Belli's role in "And The Children Shall Lead".

== Releases ==
This was released on LaserDisc in 1987 in the United States, paired with "Is There in Truth No Beauty?" on one double-sided 12-inch disc.

This episode was released in Japan on December 21, 1993, as part of the complete season 3 LaserDisc set, Star Trek: Original Series log.3. A trailer for this and the other episodes was also included, and the episode had English and Japanese audio tracks. The cover script was スター・トレック TVサードシーズン

The episode was released on VHS in the United Kingdom, paired with "The Enterprise Incident".

This episode was included in TOS Season 3 remastered DVD box set, with the remastered version of this episode.
