= Hotaling Annex West =

Historic building in San Francisco, California, US

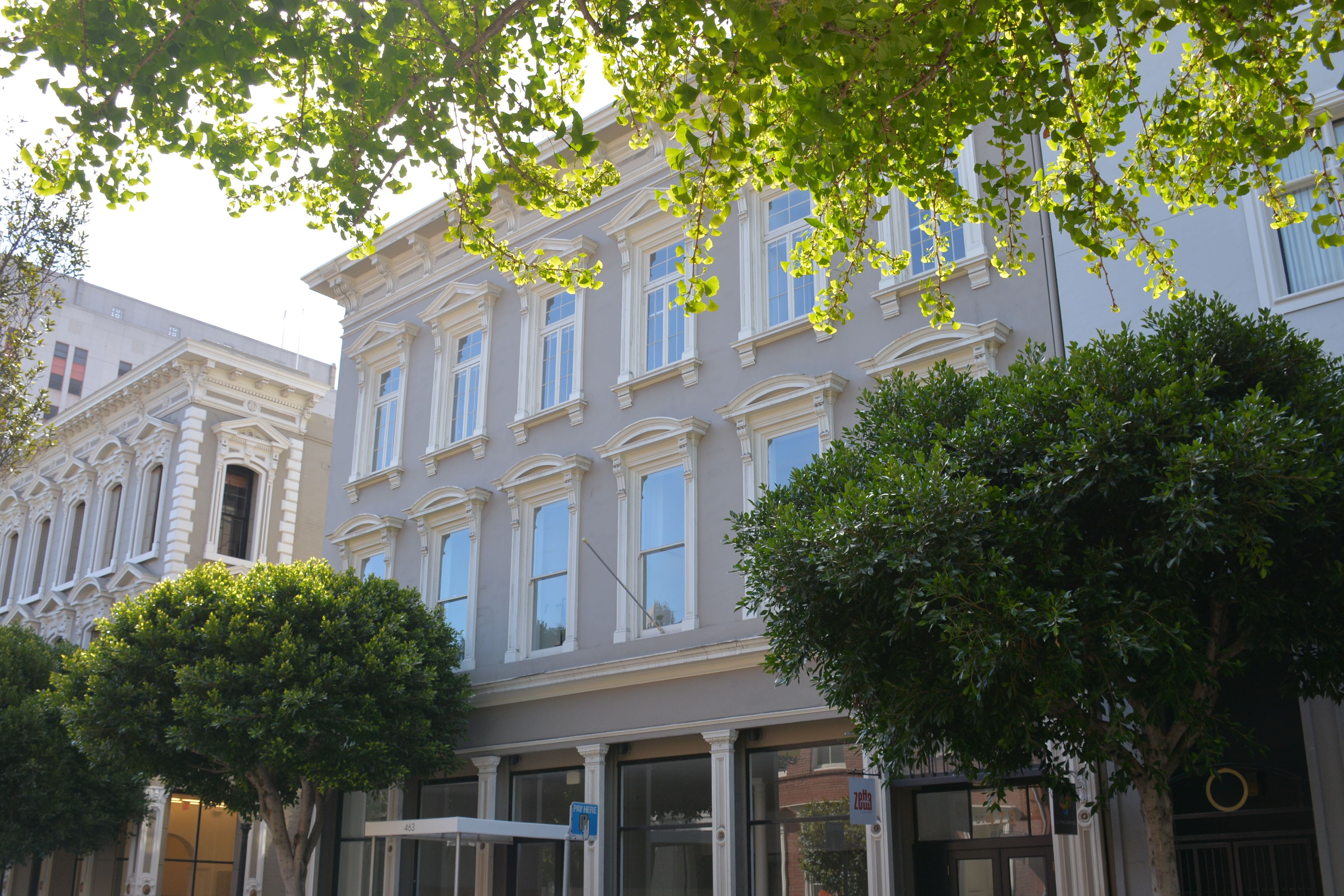
- Interactive map of Hotaling Annex West
- Location: 463–473 Jackson Street, San Francisco, California, U.S.
- Coordinates: 37.796424°N 122.403117°W
- Built: c. 1860's
- Architectural style: Italianate style

San Francisco Designated Landmark
- Designated: March 9, 1969
- Reference no.: 20

The Hotaling Annex West is a historic building located at 463–473 Jackson Street, in Jackson Square, San Francisco, California. It is a San Francisco Designated Landmark (no. 20) since 1969, and is part of the Jackson Square Historic District.

== History ==
It is an Italianate style building that was built in the c. 1860's, the early owners are unknown. It is located at 463–473 Jackson Street, near Hotaling Place. In the late 1870's, the building housed Dominick Small, a local builder and carpenter.

From c. 1890 until 1944, the building was owned by Anson Parsons Hotaling for his liquor business, who also owned the nearby Hotaling Building at 451 Jackson Street.

In the 1930s, the Works Progress Administration (WPA) rented the building for the Federal Writers' Project and Federal Art Project. In 1942, Walter McElroy took over the lease, and in 1945 the lease changed to Emmy Lou Packard. During World War II, the tenants included Emmy Lou Packard, Avrum Rubinstein (1918–1995), Martin Snipper (1914–2008), Giacomo Patri, and Byron Randall.

In the 1950s, the building was converted into an interior design showroom.
