= Ground Zero (1973 film) =

- Directed by: James T. Flocker
- Written by: Samuel Newman
- Produced by: João Botelho
- Starring: Ron Casteel; Melvin Belli; Augie Tribach; Kim C. Friese; John Waugh; Yvonne D'Angers; Hal Stein; Dominic Guzzo; Anthony Curcio; Mike Maurantonio; Lia Belli
- Cinematography: Dave Flocker
- Edited by: David E. Jackson
- Music by: Mike Sedlak; Mark Comer; Melvin Belli; Augie Tribach; Kim C. Friese; Frank Vierra
- Release date: 2 May 1973
- Running time: 83 min.
- Country: United States
- Language: English

Ground Zero is a 1973 American Thriller film directed and produced by James T. Flocker. The film stars Ron Casteel, John Waugh, Yvonne D'Angers, Hal Stein and Dominic Guzzo in the lead roles.

== Story ==
Terrorists place a powerful nuclear explosive on the Golden Gate Bridge which puts the West Coast under siege. An agent is sent in with the task to disarm the bomb.

== Cast ==
- Ron Casteel
- Melvin Belli
- Augie Tribach
- Kim C. Friese
- John Waugh
- Yvonne D'Angers
- Hal Stein
- Dominic Guzzo
- Anthony Curcio
- Mike Maurantonio
- Lia Belli
