= Charles Henry Webb =

American poet (1834–1905)

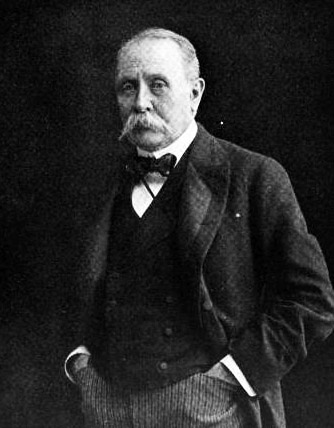
Charles Henry Webb, 1902

Charles Henry Webb (January 24, 1834 – May 24, 1905) was an American poet, author and journalist. He was particularly known for his parodies and humorous writings.

== Biography ==
Webb was born at Rouse's Point, New York in 1834.

Webb worked as both a whaler and a war correspondent. He spent three years at sea, and was then taken on by The New York Times where he covered the front lines of the Civil War.

In April 1862, he moved to San Francisco, California and became literary editor of the San Francisco Bulletin before becoming the highest paid contributor to The Golden Era under pen names like "Inigo" and "John Paul". In his regular column for the Era in December 1863, he announced that he and Bret Harte "laid our heads together over a Mint Julep... [and] determined to start a paper" of their own. The first issue of this project, The Californian, was released in May 1864. Webb's irreverent tone and burlesques of California life and Californians, however, were not successful and in 1866 he left The Californian and returned to the East Coast.

When his friend Mark Twain had difficulty finding a publisher for his first collection of sketches, Webb offered to take on the project himself. Webb served as both editor and publisher for The Celebrated Jumping Frog of Calaveras County, and Other Sketches When it was released under the American News Company imprint in 1867, Twain reported to a newspaper, "[Webb] has gotten it up in excellent style, and has done everything to suit his own taste, which is excellent. I have made no suggestions."

In 1867, Webb wrote St. Twel'mo, or the Cuneiform Cyclopedist of Chattanooga, a parody of the novel St. Elmo by Augusta Evans Wilson which had sold over a million copies within four months of its publication the year before.

In the 1890s, Webb spent his summers in Nantucket at 77 Main Street, known as the Francis Macy House.

Webb died in New York on May 24, 1905.

== Publications ==
- Our Friend from Victoria (Drama, 1865)
- Arrah-na-Poke (Drama, 1865)
- Liffith Lank, or Lunacy (1867), a parody of Charles Reade’s Griffith Gaunt
- St. Twelmo, or the Cuneiform Cyclopedist of Chattanooga (1868), a parody of Augusta Evans Wilson's St. Elmo
- John Paul's Book: Moral and Instructive: Consisting of Travels, Tales, Poetry, and Like Fabrications (1874)
- The Wickedest Woman in New York (1875)
- Parodies, Prose, and Verse (1876)
- Sea-Weed and what we seed: my Vacation at Long Branch and Saratoga (1876)
- Vagrom Verse (1889)
- With Lead and Line along Varying Shores: A Book of Poems (1901)
