= The Celebrated Jumping Frog of Calaveras County =

1865 short story by Mark Twain

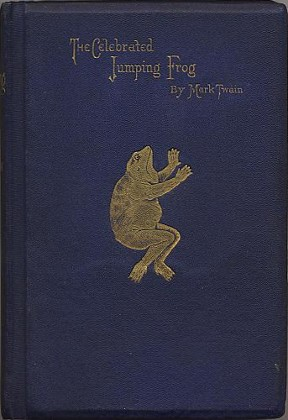
First edition (published by Charles Henry Webb)

"The Celebrated Jumping Frog of Calaveras County" is an 1865 short story by Mark Twain. It was his first great success as a writer and brought him national attention. The story has also been published as "Jim Smiley and His Jumping Frog" (its original title) and "The Notorious Jumping Frog of Calaveras County". In it, the narrator retells a story he heard from a bartender, Simon Wheeler, at the Angels Hotel in Angels Camp, California, about the gambler Jim Smiley. The narrator describes him: "If he even seen a straddle bug start to go anywhere, he would bet you how long it would take him to get to wherever he going to, and if you took him up, he would foller that straddle bug to Mexico but what he would find out where he was bound for and how long he was on the road."

The Celebrated Jumping Frog of Calaveras County, and Other Sketches is also the title story of an 1867 collection of short stories by Mark Twain. It was Twain's first book and collected 27 stories that were previously published in magazines and newspapers.

== Publication history ==
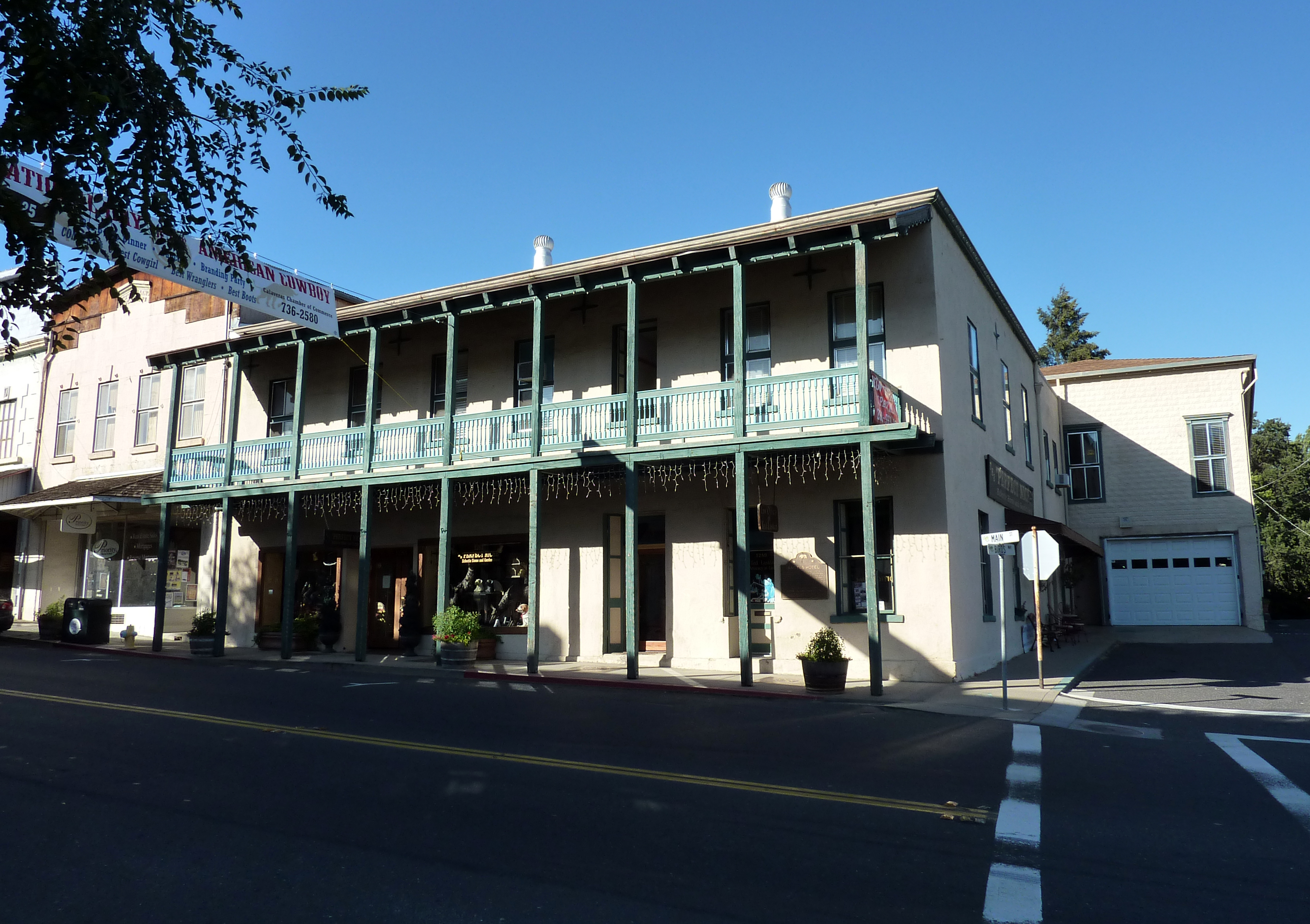
The Angels Hotel

Twain first wrote the title short story at the request of his friend Artemus Ward, for inclusion in an upcoming book. Twain worked on two versions, but neither was satisfactory to him—neither got around to describing the jumping frog contest. Ward pressed him again, but by the time Twain devised a version he was willing to submit, that book was already nearing publication, so Ward sent it instead to The New York Saturday Press, where it appeared in the November 18, 1865, edition as "Jim Smiley and His Jumping Frog". Twain's colorful story was immensely popular, and was soon printed in many different magazines and newspapers. Twain developed the idea further, and Bret Harte published this version in The Californian on December 16, 1865; this time titled "The Celebrated Jumping Frog of Calaveras County", and Smiley's name was changed to Greeley.

Further popularity of the tale led Twain to use the story to anchor his own first book, which appeared in 1867 with a first issue run of only 1,000 copies. The first edition was issued with covers in seven colors (with no priority) — blue, brown, green, lavender, plum, red, and terra-cotta — and is sought after by book collectors, fetching thousands of dollars at auctions. In the book version, Twain changed Greeley back to Smiley.

== Plot summary ==
The narrator is sent by a friend to interview an old man, Simon Wheeler, who might know the location of an old acquaintance named Leonidas W. Smiley. Finding Simon at an old mining camp, the narrator asks him if he knows anything about Leonidas; Simon appears not to, and instead tells a story about Jim Smiley, a man who had visited the camp years earlier.

Jim loves to gamble and will offer to bet on anything and everything, from horse races to dogfights, to the health of the local parson's wife. He catches a frog, whom he names Dan'l Webster, and spends three months training it to jump. When a stranger visits the camp, Jim shows off Dan'l and offers to bet $40 that it can out-jump any other frog in Calaveras County. The stranger, unimpressed, says that he would take the bet if he had a frog, so Jim goes out to catch one, leaving him alone with Dan'l. While Jim is away, the stranger pours lead shot down Dan'l's throat. Once Jim returns, he and the stranger set the frogs down and let them loose. The stranger's frog jumps away while Dan'l does not budge, and the surprised and disgusted Jim pays the $40 wager. After the stranger has departed, Jim notices Dan'l's sluggishness and picks the frog up, finding it to be much heavier than he remembers. When Dan'l belches out a double handful of lead shot, Jim realizes that he has been cheated and chases after the stranger, but never catches him.

At this point in the story, Simon excuses himself to go outside for a moment. The narrator realizes that Jim has no connection to Leonidas and gets up to leave, only to have Simon stop him at the door, offering to tell him about a yellow, one-eyed, stubby-tailed cow that Jim had owned. Rather than stay to hear another pointless story, the narrator excuses himself and leaves. He muses that his friend may have fabricated Leonidas as a pretext to trick him into listening to Simon's anecdotes.

== Translations ==
Upon discovering a French translation of this story by Thérèse Bentzon published in 1872, Twain back-translated the story into English, word for word, retaining the French grammatical structure and syntax. He then published all three versions in 1903 under the title "The Jumping Frog: in English, then in French, and then Clawed Back into a Civilized Language Once More by Patient, Unremunerated Toil".

In "Private History of the ‘Jumping Frog’ Story", Twain recounts how he encountered some plagiarism of the story from an unlikely source. He was surprised to find that the frog story was apparently taken from an ancient Greek tale. He wrote:

Now, then, the interesting question is, did the frog episode happen in Angels Camp in the spring of ‘49, as told in my hearing that day in the fall of 1865? I am perfectly sure that it did. I am also sure that its duplicate happened in Boeotia a couple of thousand years ago. I think it must be a case of history actually repeating itself, and not a case of a good story floating down the ages and surviving because too good to be allowed to perish.

Later, however, in November 1903, Twain noted that he had uncovered the anachronism of finding Twain's story in Sidgwick's Greek textbook:

When I became convinced that the "Jumping Frog" was a Greek story two or three thousand years old, I was sincerely happy, for apparently here was a most striking and satisfactory justification of a favorite theory of mine—to wit, that no occurrence is sole and solitary, but is merely a repetition of a thing which has happened before, and perhaps often.... By-and-by, in England, after a few years, I learned that there hadn't been any Greek frog in the business, and no Greek story about his adventures. Professor Sidgwick [in his textbook for students learning to translate English texts into Greek, Greek Prose Composition, p. 116] had not claimed that it was a Greek tale; he had merely synopsized the Calaveras tale and transferred the incident to classic Greece; but as he did not state that it was the same old frog, the English papers reproved him for the omission. He told me this in England in 1899 or 1900, and was much troubled about that censure, for his act had been innocent, he believing that the story's origin was so well known as to render formal mention of it unnecessary.

But in A. Sidgwick's "Note to the Thirteenth Edition" (1907), among "hearty... thanks for... help received", Prof. Sidgwick still failed to acknowledge his use of the Twain tale.

== Adaptations ==
Lukas Foss composed The Jumping Frog of Calaveras County, an opera in two scenes with libretto by Jean Karsavina, based on Twain's story. The opera premiered on May 18, 1950, at Indiana University.

The story was also adapted as a scene in the film The Adventures of Mark Twain (1985), in which Mark Twain retells the story in short to Tom Sawyer, Huck Finn, and Becky Thatcher.

== Short story collection ==
The short story collection The Celebrated Jumping Frog of Calaveras County, and Other Sketches, Twain's first book, contains 27 short stories and sketches. It was published by the American News Company in 1867 under the editorship of Twain's friend Charles Henry Webb. Privately, to his colleague Bret Harte, Twain wrote it was "full of damnable errors of grammar and deadly inconsistencies of spelling in the Frog sketch because I did not read the proofs". After its May release, the book suffered from lackluster sales. The collection included:

- "The Celebrated Jumping Frog of Calaveras County"
- "Aurelia's Unfortunate Young Man"
- "A Complaint about Correspondents, Dated in San Francisco"
- "Answers to Correspondents"
- "Among the Fenians"
- "The Story of the Bad Little Boy Who Didn't Come to Grief"
- "Curing a Cold"
- "An Inquiry about Insurances"
- "Literature in the Dry Diggings"
- "'After' Jenkins"
- "Lucretia Smith's Soldier"
- "The Killing of Julius Caesar 'Localized'"
- "An Item which the Editor Himself could not Understand"
- "Among the Spirits"
- "Brief Biographical Sketch of George Washington"
- "A Touching Story of George Washington's Boyhood"
- "A Page from a Californian Almanac"
- "Information for the Million"
- "The Launch of the Steamer Capital"
- "Origin of Illustrious Men"
- "Advice for Good Little Girls"
- "Concerning Chambermaids"
- "Remarkable Instances of Presence of Mind"
- "Honored as a Curiosity in Honolulu"
- "The Steed 'Oahu'"
- "A Strange Dream"
- "Short and Singular Rations"
- "Cannibalism in the Cars"

== See also ==
- Frog jumping
- Translation
