= Frog jumping contest =

Frogs are entered in competitions to jump certain distances

Calaveras County Fair and Jumping Frog Jubilee 2016

Frog jumping is a competitive pastime for humans in which frogs are entered in competitions to jump certain distances. Frog jumping contests are held in small communities around the United States as part of the folk culture.

Frog jumping was made famous in a short story called "The Celebrated Jumping Frog of Calaveras County" by Mark Twain. An event, inspired by the Twain story, has been held annually in Angels Camp, in California's Calaveras County since 1928, with other events held in Indiana, Illinois, Ohio, Washington, Maine, Missouri, Louisiana, New York, Wisconsin, and also Manitoba, Canada.

With 4,000 contestants in 2007, the Calaveras County contest has imposed strict rules regulating the frog's welfare, including limiting the daily number of a frog's jumps and mandating the playing of calming music in their enclosures. Entering specimens of the California red-legged frog in the competition is illegal because it is an endangered species. Participants entering the longest-jumping frog were to win a $750 prize, or $5,000 if their frog were to break the 1986 record of 21 feet 5 3/4 inches (6.547 m) set by "Rosie the Ribiter."
