= Transamerica Corporation =

American private holding company

- Type: Subsidiary
- Industry: Insurance; Investments; Retirement planning
- Founded: 1928; 98 years ago
- Founder: A. P. Giannini
- Headquarters: Baltimore, Maryland, US
- Number of locations: 10
- Area served: North America
- Key people: Will Fuller (CEO)
- Products: Life insurance, Investment & Retirement services
- Number of employees: 6,800 (2023)
- Parent: Aegon
- Website: www.transamerica.com

Transamerica Corporation is an American holding company for various life insurance companies and investment firms operating primarily in the United States, offering life and supplemental health insurance, investments, and retirement services. The company is located in Baltimore, Maryland, with its subsidiary Transamerica Life Company headquartered in Cedar Rapids, Iowa; It has back offices Denver, Colorado; Harrison, New York; Toronto, Ontario; Philadelphia, Pennsylvania; and Knoxville, Tennessee. Additional affiliated offices are located throughout the United States. In 1999, it became an independent subsidiary of multinational company Aegon.

Contributions from the Transamerica Life Insurance Company and its affiliates fund the Transamerica Institute, a nonprofit, private foundation. The Transamerica Center for Retirement Studies is an operating division of Transamerica Institute.

== History ==
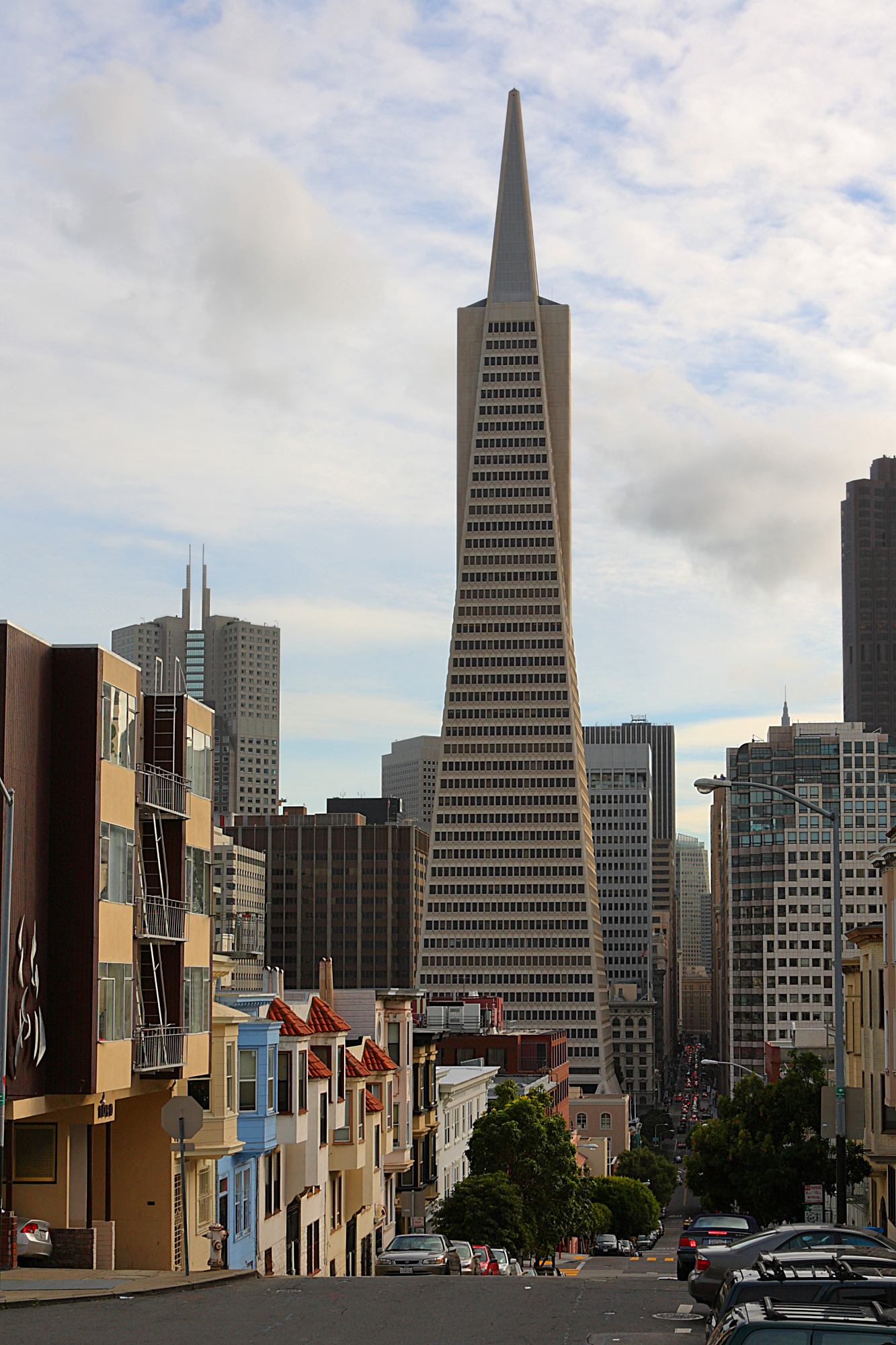
The Transamerica Pyramid in San Francisco

In October 1904, A. P. Giannini founded the Bank of Italy in San Francisco. In October 1928, Giannini created a holding company that he named the Transamerica Corporation, which owned Bank of America, Bank of Italy, Bancitaly Corporation, National Bankitaly Company, California Joint Stock Land Bank, and Banca d'America e d'Italia, which gave it assets in excess of $1.5 billion (equivalent to $28 billion in 2025). The Transamerica Corporation original headquarters was located at 4 Columbus Avenue in San Francisco. The Bank of Italy later merged with Bank of America, Los Angeles in 1928, which was then renamed Bank of America in 1930.

In March 1930, Transamerica acquired Occidental Life Insurance Company, founded in 1906. At the time, Occidental had over $25 million in assets and over $150 million in life insurance policies in force. Giannini said the purchase of the West Coast-based life insurance company was part of a plan for Transamerica to control every type of financial service. Following the acquisition, Occidental was renamed Transamerica Occidental Life Insurance Company.

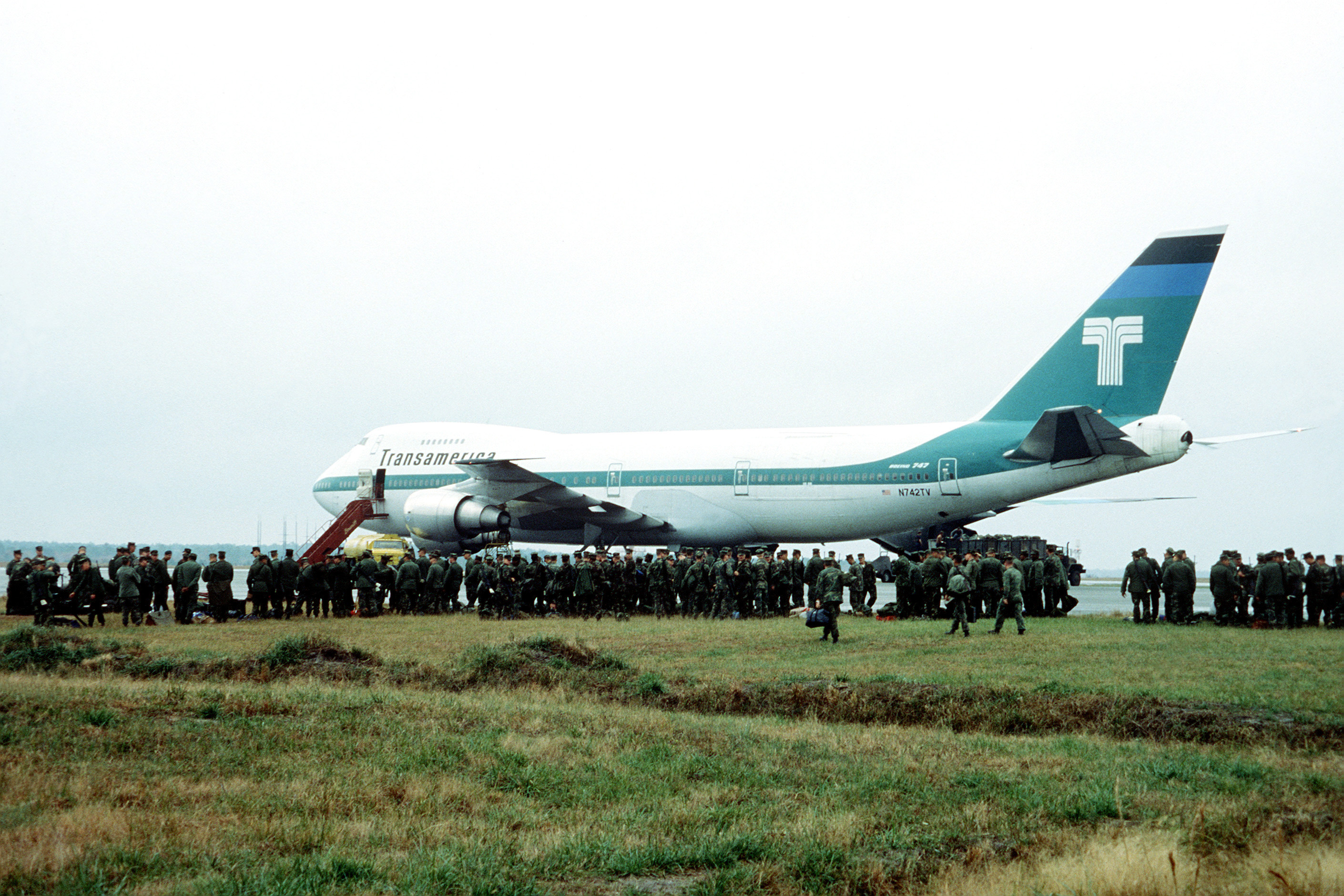
Transamerica Airlines Boeing 747 Marine Corps Air Station Cherry Point 1982

Over time, the company became a more diversified conglomerate that included Liberty Records, the film distributor United Artists, Trans International Airlines (bought from Kirk Kerkorian, later known as Transamerica Airlines) and Budget Rent a Car.

In 1972, the company completed construction of the Transamerica Pyramid skyscraper in San Francisco which served as its headquarters for many years. Although the company currently retains no offices in the building, the pyramid is still depicted in the company's updated logo (as of 2025) and marketing materials.

In the 1980s, Transamerica began to divest and focused exclusively on financial services. In 1981, Transamerica sold United Artists to Tracinda Corporation, a media company owned by Kirk Kerkorian which in turn also owned Metro-Goldwyn-Mayer. (Note: On February 11, 2005, Kirk Kerkorian sold Metro-Goldwyn-Mayer to a consortium led by Sony. On May 19, 2009, following the completion of a $1 billion stock offering by MGM Mirage, Kirk Kerkorian and Tracinda Corporation lost their majority ownership of the gaming company, dropping from 53.8 percent to 39 percent and even after pledging to purchase 10 percent of the new stock offering they now remain minority owners. On June 15, 2010, shareholders voted for MGM Mirage to change its name to "MGM Resorts International". On September 16, 2019, Tracinda Corporation, a media company owned by the deceased Kirk Kerkorian, has sold its remaining shares of MGM Resorts International, a divestiture planned after Kirk Kerkorian's death on June 15, 2015.) Transamerica was eventually reduced to three main product divisions: insurance, investments, and retirement planning. In July 1999, Transamerica CEO Frank C. Herringer announced that Aegon, the Netherlands-based insurer, would acquire the company. Transamerica Occidental merged into Transamerica Life Insurance Company on October 1, 2008.

In 2018, Transamerica entered a 10-year, $2 billion agreement with Tata Consultancy Services, an Indian technology company, to digitize their policies under a single platform. However, this project was abandoned in 2023.

== Products and services ==
Transamerica primarily offers insurance, retirement, and investment services. Types of life and health insurance policies offered include term life, whole life, universal life, variable universal life, accidental death, and final expense. Transamerica companies also offer a variety of mutual funds and annuities.

Transamerica's retirement division offers defined benefit pension plans and defined contribution retirement plans, including 401(k) and 403(b), 457, profit sharing, money purchase, cash balance, Taft-Hartley, multiple employer plans, pooled employer plans, retirement plan exchanges, nonqualified deferred compensation, and rollover individual retirement accounts. Other services include plan-level record keeping and administrative services, participant communications and education services, fiduciary risk mitigation services, open investment architecture, and compliance guidance and regulatory support.

In December 2020, Transamerica announced it would no longer sell variable annuities with benefit riders and fixed index annuities and is also exiting the standalone long-term care market.

== Partnerships ==
Transamerica has a long history of supporting third-party research and thought leadership, including Massachusetts Institute of Technology AgeLab. Previous work includes American Heart Association, Stanford's Center on Longevity, Georgetown's AgingWell Hub, and Alzheimer's Association.

Transamerica has sponsored Zach Johnson his entire PGA TOUR career. The 2023 US Ryder Cup team captain and 12-time PGA TOUR winner, including the 2007 Masters and 2015 Open Championship, Johnson grew up in the Cedar Rapids community, home to many Transamerica employees. Transamerica is also a longtime sponsor of Azahara Munoz, 2009 LPGA Rookie of the Year.

== Foundations ==
Transamerica funds two foundations: the Aegon Transamerica Foundation and the Transamerica Institute. It created the Aegon Transamerica Foundation in 1994 to provide financial grants to community nonprofits. Transamerica employees also volunteer services to these organizations. The foundation received the Corporate Citizenship Award in 2013 for creating the first urban farm in Iowa.

Transamerica Institute is a nonprofit, private foundation dedicated to identifying, researching, and educating the public about health and wellness, employment, financial literacy, longevity, and retirement. The Transamerica Center for Retirement Studies (TCRS), an operating division of Transamerica Institute, focuses on trends, issues, and opportunities related to saving and planning for retirement and achieving financial security in retirement.

== See also ==
- Transamerica Pyramid
- Old Transamerica Building
