= The Californian (1860s newspaper) =

Newspaper in San Francisco, California

The Californian was a San Francisco literary newspaper published weekly from May 28, 1864 until February 1, 1868.

== History ==
The Californian was started in May 1864 by publishers P.J. Thomas, A.A. Stickney and John Collner. Charles Henry "Inigo" Webb was the first editor, and Fitz Hugh Ludlow was one of the first contributors. Bret Harte was an editor, and Mark Twain was hired at a salary of $50 per month. Harte contributed articles as well, and the periodical jumped to the fore among its competitors in the San Francisco Bay Area including the Golden Era.

The paper was published in the "imperial size", an industry term. It measured 22 inches across and thirty inches high with easy to read pages that ran three columns across. According to Ben Tarnoff, "Readers expecting tales of honest miners, or lyrical tributes to California's landscape, would be disappointed. Like Harte himself, the Californian took pleasure in puncturing cliches. It could be populist or aristocratic, radical or conservative--but always contrarian."

The publication featured poetry and condensed novels by Harte—these poked fun at the literary styling of authors such as Charles Dickens, Mary Elizabeth Braddon and James Fenimore Cooper. Twain also contributed his condensed novels Whereas and Lucretia Smith's Soldier. Several other San Franciscan poets contributed including Harte, Charles Warren Stoddard and Ina Coolbrith.

After a period of rest at Lake Tahoe, Webb resumed editing duties in November 1864. He continued in this role until April 1865.

Twain submitted "The Celebrated Jumping Frog of Calaveras County" which was published in December 1865 (it had been originally published in the Saturday Press). This story and others were later published in a book of the same title. Webb had become both owner and editor of The Californian. By 1866, however, Webb disassociated from the publication and returned to the East Coast after his irreverent tone and burlesque style which frequently targeted California life and Californians did not endear him to his audience. Writer and poet James F. Bowman then served as de facto editor.

Ambrose Bierce's first contribution to The Californian was in September 1867, a poem entitled "The Basilica". He followed with his first non-fiction essay, "Female Suffrage", in December.

Charles Warren Stoddard was brought on board late in the life of The Californian. Stoddard expected to write articles, but instead kept the books and mailed subscriptions. Stoddard and Bierce became good friends. In 1867, Stoddard wrote a book of poetry entitled Poems. Bowman wrote a grandiose review of Stoddard's work in The Californian, then turned around and savaged both Stoddard and his earlier review, writing anonymously in the de Young paper Dramatic Chronicle.

The paper was initially located at 728 Montgomery Street in San Francisco but by April 1865 was moved to an alley off of Montgomery Street.
