= Belli Building =

Historic building in San Francisco, California, US

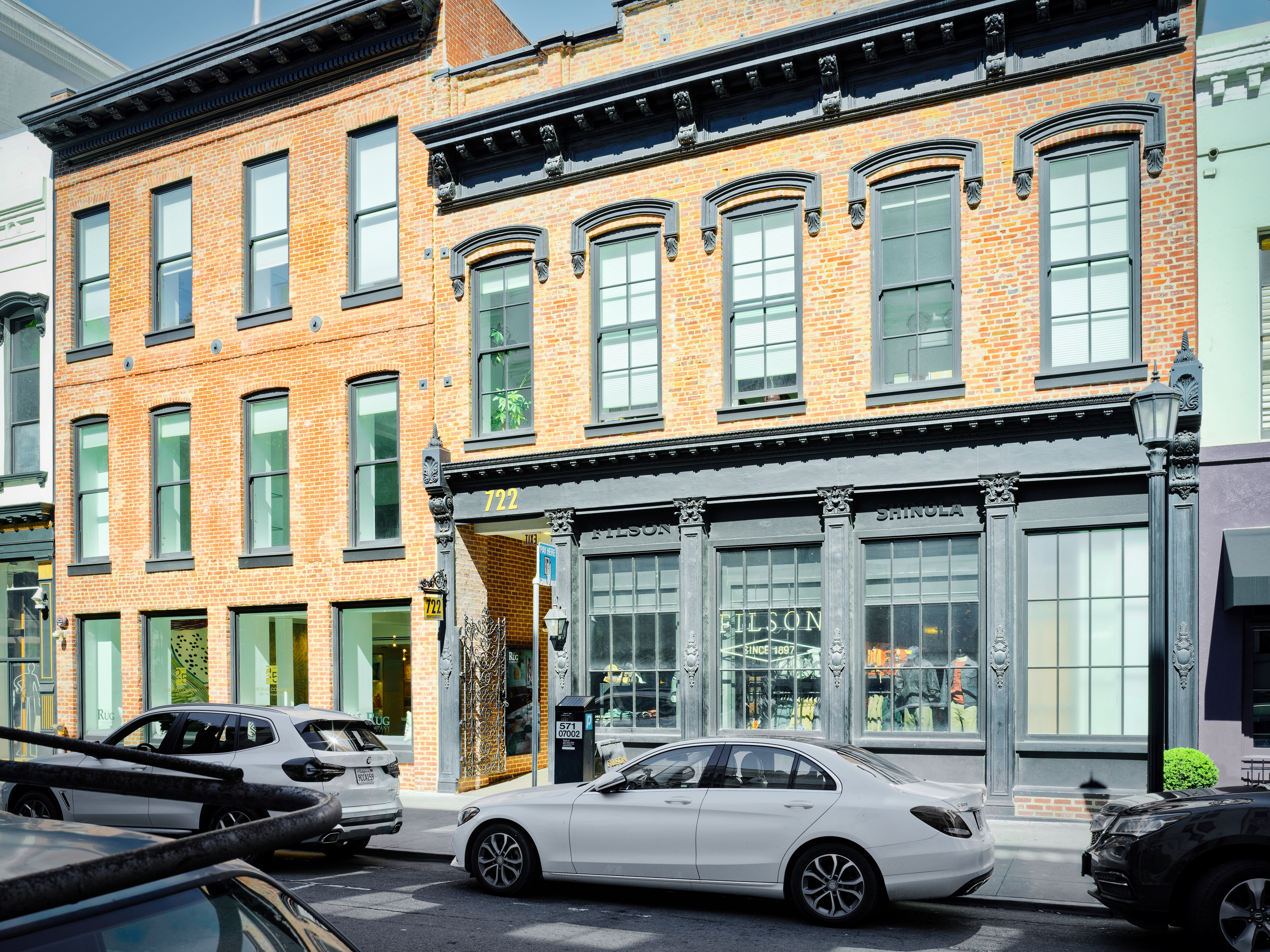
- The Belli Building is the short building on the right
- Interactive map of Belli Building
- Location: 722–728 Montgomery Street, Jackson Square, San Francisco, California, U.S.
- Coordinates: 37.7961°N 122.4033°W
- Built: c. 1851

San Francisco Designated Landmark
- Designated: February 3, 1969
- Reference no.: 9

Belli Building is a historic multi-use building, built in c. 1851 in the Jackson Square neighborhood at 722–728 Montgomery Street in San Francisco, California. After the 1989 earthquake, the Belli Building and the adjacent Genella Building (also known as the Belli Annex at 726–728 Montgomery Street) were damaged and left vacant for many years, and subsequently renovated together. Since 2015, these two buildings are an apartment building with only the façades saved, called 722 Montgomery.

The Belli Building has been listed as a San Francisco Designated Landmark (no. 9) since 1969, and is part of the Jackson Square Historic District. The Genella Building is separately listed as a San Francisco Designated Landmark (no. 10). The Belli Building was first known as the Langerman's Tobacco and Segar Warehouse, and then later as the Melodeon Theatre.

== History ==
The building was originally built as Langerman's Tobacco and Segar (Cigar) Warehouse sometime between 1849 and 1850 on the waterfront of Yerba Buena Cove, and it was damaged in c. 1851 in a fire. It was built upon 6 inches (150 mm) by 8 inches (200 mm) thick wood planks, and at a depth of 8 feet (2.4 m) laid as the foundation in the mud. The large wooden beams in the building had once been the masts of ships.

It was rebuilt in c. 1851 using the same old brick walls and old foundation. It was turned into the Melodeon Theatre briefly, where Lotta Crabtree performed. After the 1860's the Melodeon Theatre closed, and the building was used for many diverse purposes.

It was named after Melvin Belli (1907–1996), a local lawyer and writer, who had acquired the building in 1959 to use as his law office. During this period, on top of the building Belli placed a skull and crossbones on a staff. Belli decorated the interior in an old Western meets Victorian theme, with materials such as wrought iron and red velvet.

After the 1989 Loma Prieta earthquake, the brick Belli Building and the adjoining Genella Building (726–728 Montgomery) were structurally damaged, and left vacant for 25 years. In 2000, permit plans were approved for a renovation, which was led by Nancy Ho Belli, Belli's surviving spouse and 6th wife. In 2015, it became an apartment complex.

== See also ==
- List of San Francisco Designated Landmarks
- Barbary Coast, San Francisco
