= The Golden Era =

19th-century American newspaper

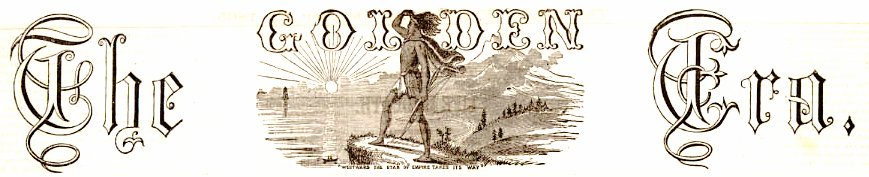
The Golden Era, October 1865

The Golden Era was a 19th-century San Francisco newspaper. The publication featured the writing of Mark Twain, Bret Harte, Charles Warren Stoddard (writing at first as "Pip Pepperpod"), Fitz Hugh Ludlow, Adah Isaacs Menken, Ada Clare, Prentice Mulford, Dan De Quille, J. S. Hittell and some women such as Frances Fuller Victor. Stoddard recalled the newspaper as "the chief literary organ west of the Rocky Mountains".

== History ==
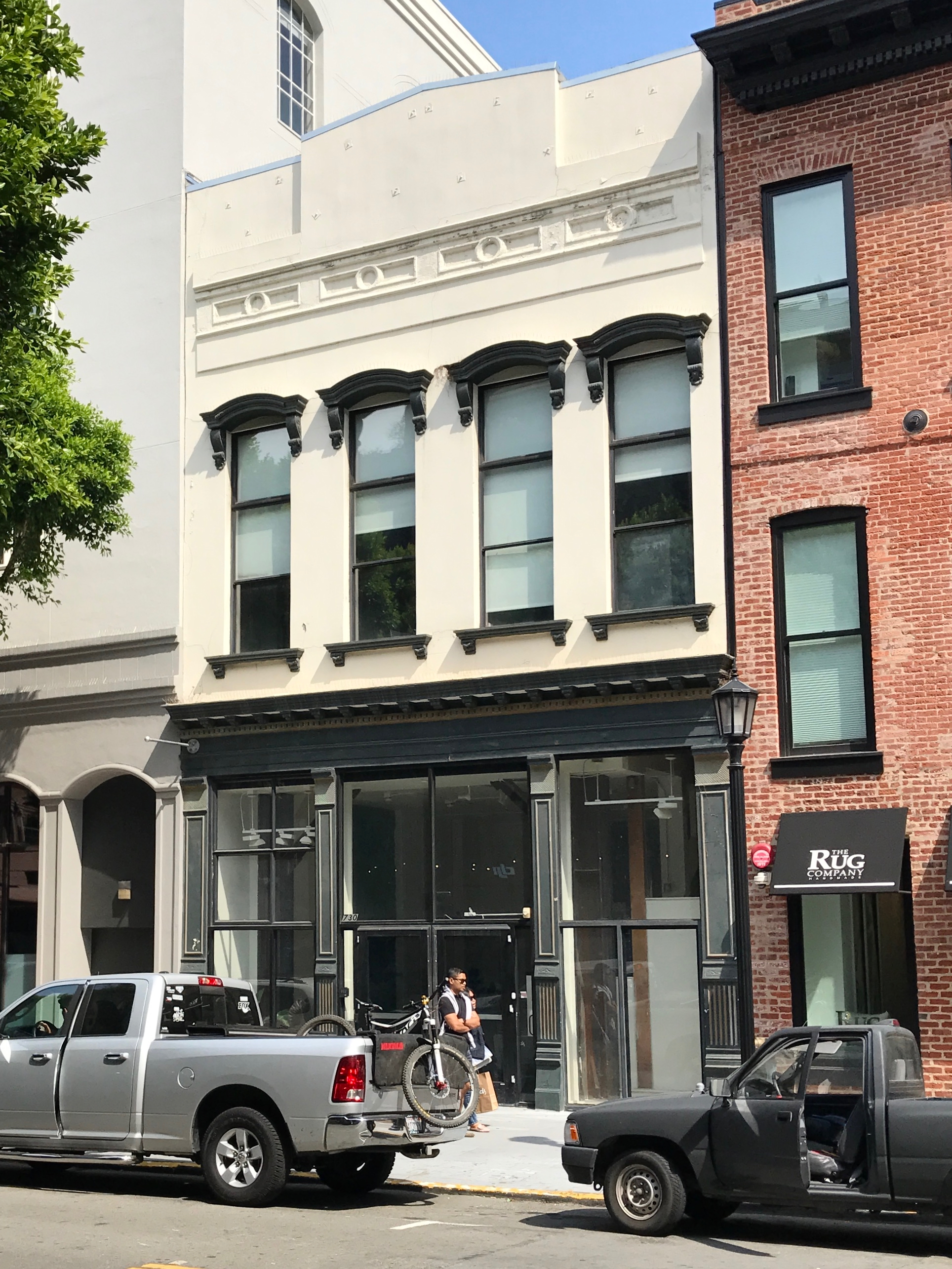
The Golden Era Building (1852) is a landmark in the Jackson Square Historic District

The Golden Era began in 1852 as a weekly founded by Rollin M. Daggett and J. Macdonough Foard. In 1860 it was sold to James Brooks and Joseph E. Lawrence. In the spring of 1860, they hired Bret Harte as editor and he focused on making it a more literary publication. He had previously published his first poem in the Golden Era in 1857 and, in October of that same year, his first prose piece on "A Trip Up the Coast". Twain later recalled that, as an editor, Harte struck "a new and fresh and spirited note" which "rose above that orchestra's mumbling confusion and was recognizable as music".

In the 1860s, New Yorker Charles Henry Webb became the highest paid contributor to the magazine. In his regular column at the end of 1863, he announced that he and Harte "determined to start a paper" of their own. The result was the Californian, a weekly begun in May 1864, with Webb as publisher and Harte as star contributor and occasional editor. For the rest of the decade, The Golden Era and The Californian were significant rivals until Harte became the editor of the Overland Monthly in 1868.

Harr Wagner bought the weekly in 1882. In January 1886, Wagner changed to monthly publication, and hired Joaquin Miller as editor. Wagner married poet Madge Morris who was already a contributor, and her contributions became more numerous. From 1885 to 1895, Madge served as editor, or assistant editor. In 1887, Wagner moved the periodical to San Diego, California—city officials enticed him with a $5,000 subsidy.

The office for The Golden Era was located initially in the Golden Era Building on 742 Montgomery Street from 1852 until 1854; and later on Clay Street.
