= Golden Era Building =

1852 historic building in San Francisco

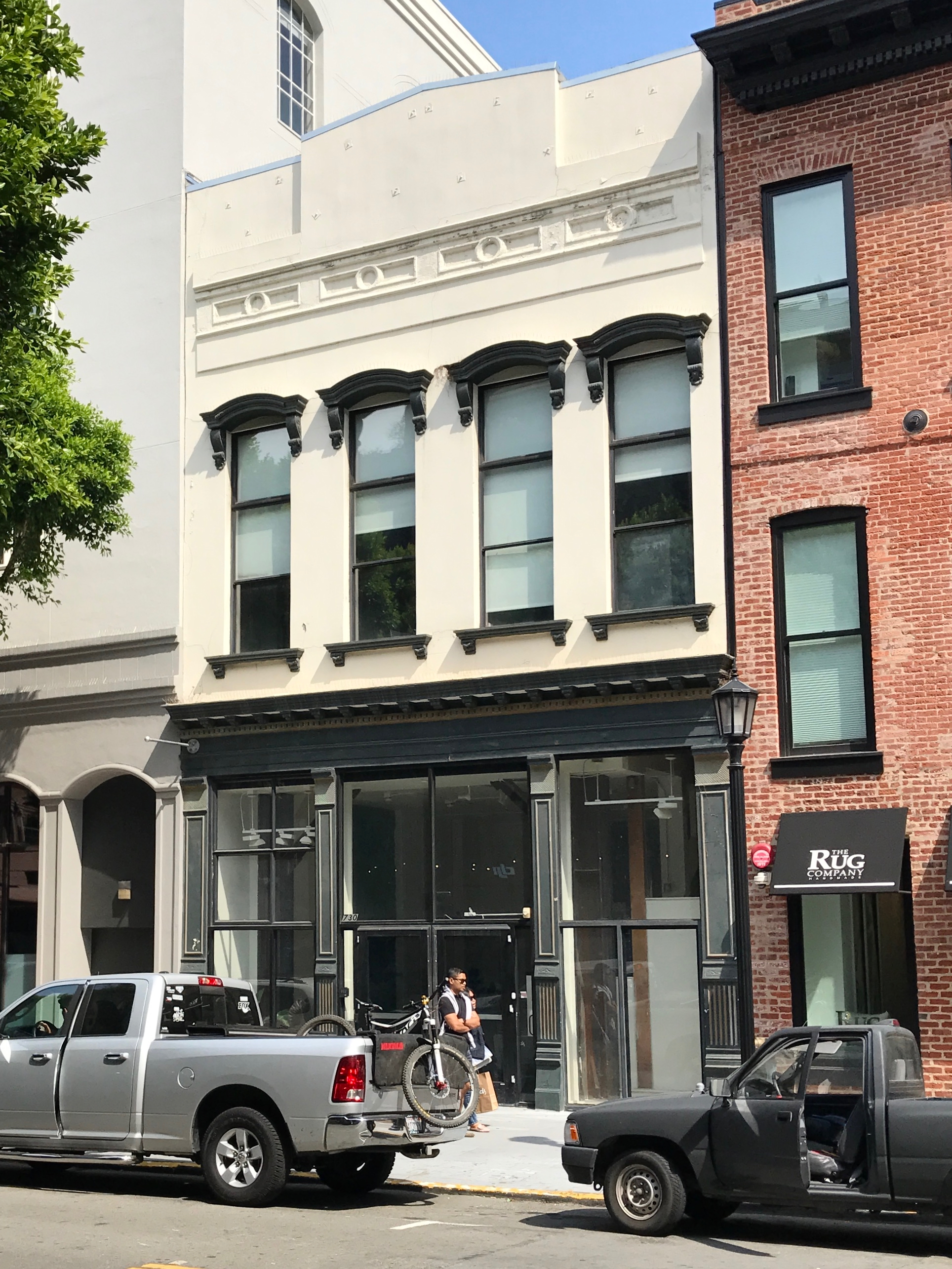

- Location within San Francisco County Location within California Location within the United States
- 37.796212°N 122.403212°W
- Location: 732-734 Montgomery Street, San Francisco, California, U.S.

History
- Built: 1852

San Francisco Designated Landmark
- Designated: March 9, 1969
- Reference no.: 19

Golden Era Building, formerly known as the Call Building, is a historic commercial building built in 1852 during the California Gold Rush, and located at 732-734 Montgomery Street in the Jackson Square area of San Francisco, California.

The Golden Era Building has been listed as a San Francisco Designated Landmark since March 9, 1969; and is part of the Jackson Square Historic District which was added to the National Register of Historic Places in 1971.

== History ==
The Golden Era Building was constructed in 1852, built on the foundations of an 1849 structure that had been destroyed in the San Francisco Fire of 1851. The cast iron pillars on the exterior of the building are from a remodel in 1892 and were created locally by the Vulcan Iron Works.

In 1852, on the ground floor the space initially was occupied by Vernon Hall, which was rented out by fraternal societies and theatre troupes. The building gets its name from the 19th-century literary newspaper, The Golden Era, which occupied the second floor of the building from December 1852 until approximately 1854.

Other tenants of the building included Thomas Day's gas fixtures store (around 1863); and John Monahan and Co., a printing company that did work for the San Francisco Railway and North Pacific Railway (around 1858). The ground floor was later occupied by a crockery shop and a Chinese broom factory. The second floor was later occupied by artist studios.

== See also ==
- List of San Francisco Designated Landmarks
