= Madge Morris Wagner =

American poet and journalist

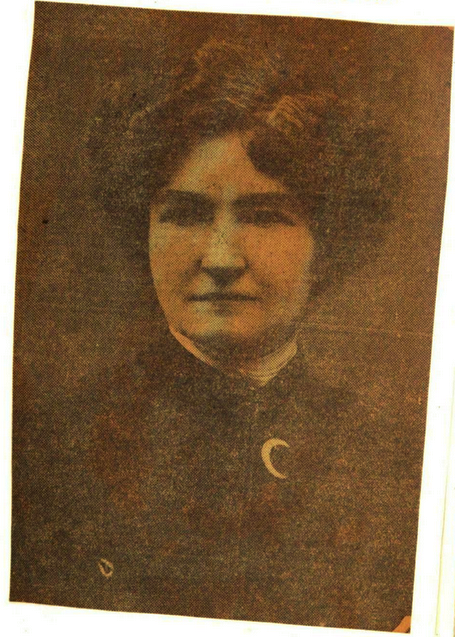
- Wagner in The Lure of the Desert, 1917
- Born: Madge Morris; April 25, 1862 Oregon, U.S.
- Died: February 27, 1924 (aged 61) San Francisco, California, U.S.
- Occupation: journalist; newspaper editor; poet; writer
- Genre: poetry; novels
- Notable works: "Liberty Bell"
- Spouse: Harr Wagner
- Children: 2

Signature
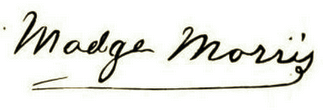

Madge Morris Wagner (née Morris; 1862–1924) was an American poet and journalist associated with The Golden Era. She was a contemporary and friend of Clara Shortridge Foltz and Frona Eunice Wait. Some of Wagner's poems were known around the world.

== Early life and education ==
Madge Morris was born April 25, 1862, in Oregon, on the plains when her parents were en route to California. She was a descendant of Capt. Morris, who built Fort Morris, in Virginia.

She was educated in the common schools.

== Career ==
Early on, Wagner became a journalist and poet. Her early work in verse was begun in San Jose, California, where she lived in the 1880s. There she served as reporter and special writer on J. J. Owen's Daily Mercury, with many of her stanzas appearing there, too. Her notability dates to an order given her, half in jest, by Owen to go to the top of the 180 feet (55 m) electric tower at Market and Santa Clara streets, and write a poem on the panorama of Santa Clara Valley to be seen from that dangerous height. Madge took the order seriously. In those days, there was a big bucket run with a windlass which took the electrician up to inspect the lanterns on top. Climbing into this bucket, she was hauled up the tower. Here, unfazed by the dizzy height, she wrote:

"I stood on the topmost tower,
And never again till I die,
Shall I glimpse such a wondrous dower
As came in that vision high."

Her patriotic poem "Liberty Bell" led to the construction of the Columbian Liberty Bell. With this, Wagner reached the acme of her notability when, in 1893, because of her poem, she and William Osborne McDowell, who conceived a great bell for the World's Columbian Exposition, were voted by the Chicago authorities the freedom of the city. Wagner's husband received a letter from McDowell, stating that his wife was appointed honorary member of the committee to create and direct the use of the Columbian Liberty Bell to be rung at the World's Fair. The bell was to be made up of slaves' chains from all parts of the world and contributions of silver, gold and copper money. It was to be cast at Troy, New York. The idea, expressed in one of Wagner's poems, was adopted as the fundamental motive in the casting of the bell, hence her appointment to an honorary position on the committee having the work in charge. One of the most notable receptions at the Exposition was that tendered by the women of the California Building, July 6, 1893, to Wagner, of San Diego, the object being to give special recognition to the fact that it was a California woman whose poem prompted the making of the new Liberty Bell.

Wagner's verse may be divided into two kinds—one is that which contains the pathetic note, the other the suppressed fire. "The Little Brown Bird" is typical of the former, the "Mystery of Carmel" the latter. Many of her poems were well adapted to recitation, such as "My Ships at Sea", "The Liberty Bell", and "Rocking the Baby".

From 1885 to 1895, she was the editor of The Golden Era, to which Bret Harte, Joaquin Miller, and Mark Twain were constant contributors. When the magazine was transplanted to San Diego, California, Wagner became assistant editor. While serving as editor of The Golden Era, every edition contained some felicitous quatrain or longer poem, or entertaining story written by her. Her style was characterized by originality and suppressed fire. She wrote prose as well as verse. Her most ambitious work was a patriotic novel, entitled A Titled Plebeian. Her shorter stories were intense and strong in local color, such as "Buzzard's Roost" and a "Memory of Adamsville".

Wagner was the author of Débris, a Book of Poems (San Francisco, 1881); Mystery of Carmel, and other Poems (1885); and a novel, The Titled Plebeian (1890).

A quest to improve her health and a love for western arid lands took Wagner to the Colorado desert where she wrote deeply emotional songs. Her lyrics caught the attention of the editor of Lippincott's Magazine, and she was persuaded to write for this periodical. Among her contributions was "The Colorado Desert". In technique "The Colorado Desert" is not conventional verse - it has no symmetry of either line or rhyme, nor is it free verse. In construction, there is a single-alternate rhymed quatrain, then a rhymed couplet. But this scheme is not continued in the succeeding six lines. A blank couplet follows after this. Here, a line shortens to four accents; there, another draws itself out to six. The whole was characterized as weird and broken, yet beautifully poetic. Wait characterized it as "the best poem ever written by a California woman".

George Wharton James, in his Course of Lectures on California Literature and its Spirit included Wagner with the "Poets of San Jose", for it was there that she first became known as a contributor to the press.

== Personal life ==
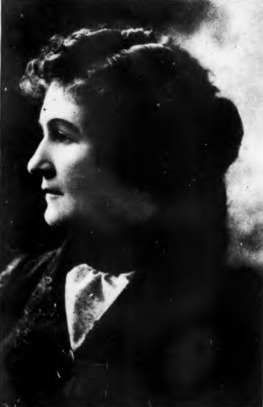
Wagner in Overland Magazine, 1924

She married Harr Wagner, editor of The Golden Era. They had two daughters.

For many years, they resided in San Francisco. In the prime of her life, Wagner lived in a cottage in Joaquin Miller Park, later named the Madge Morris Wagner Lodge. In retirement, for many years, she was a resident of San Diego, California.

Her literary work was impeded by poor health, and for long periods she wrote little.

Self-effacing to a marked degree, she was singularly susceptible to surroundings and the moods of her associates. This trait was the source of her shyness and retiring disposition.

Madge Morris Wagner died at her home in San Francisco, February 27, 1924.

== Selected works ==
- Debris (Sacramento, 1881) (text)
- Poems (San Francisco, 1885) (text)
- A Titled Plebeian (San Francisco, 1890)
- The Lure of the Desert and Other Poems (San Francisco, 1917) (text)
- Autobiography of a Tame Coyote, illustrations by James A. Holden (San Francisco, 1921) (text)
- Metric, a novel
