= Colombo Building =

Historic building in San Francisco, California

- U.S. National Register of Historic Places
- California Historical Landmark
- San Francisco Designated Landmark
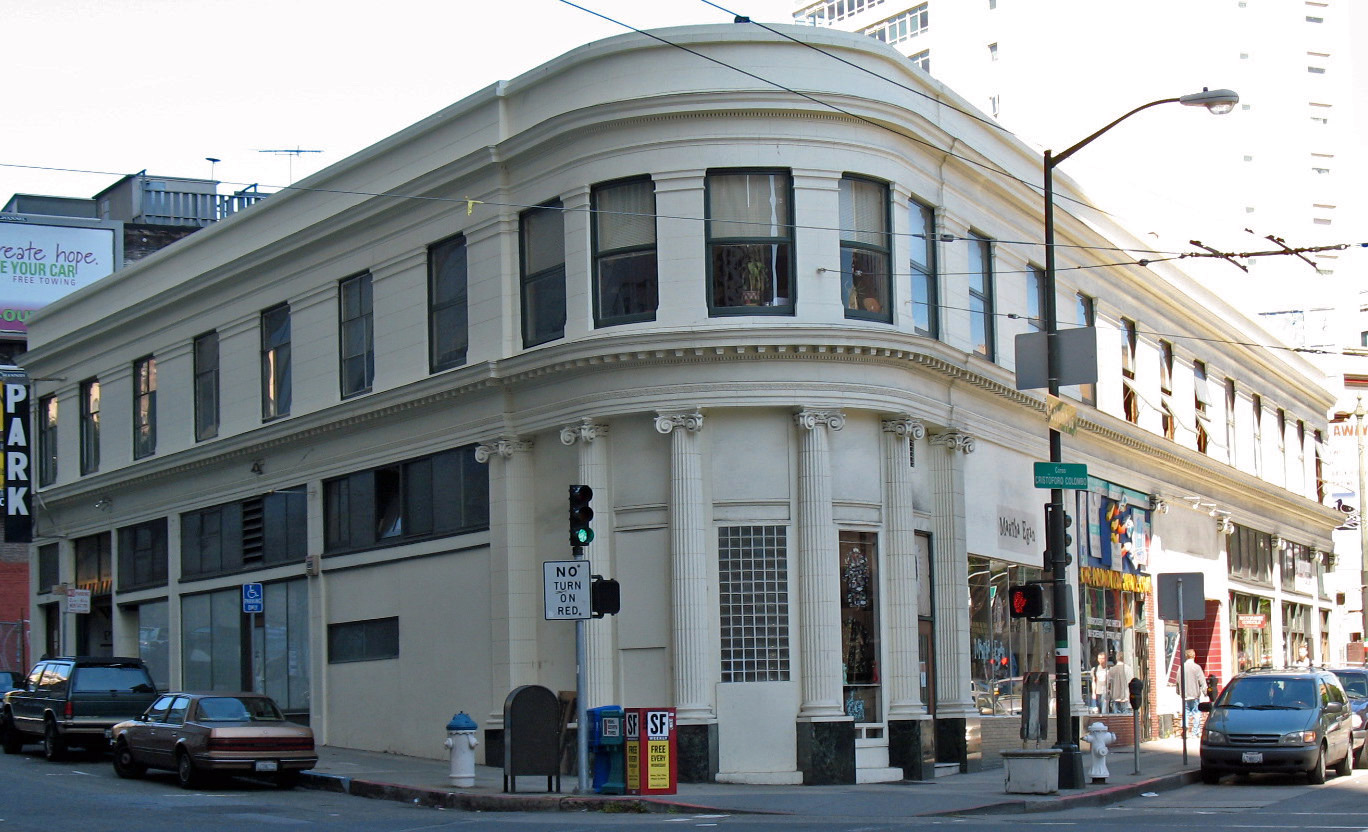

- Location within San Francisco County Location within California Location within the United States
- Location: 1–21 Columbus Avenue, San Francisco, California, 94111 U.S.
- Coordinates: 37.7956°N 122.4037°W
- Built: 1913
- Architect: Reid & Reid
- Architectural style: Classical Revival
- NRHP reference No.: 07001469
- CHISL No.: 07001469
- SFDL No.: 237

Significant dates
- Added to NRHP: January 31, 2008
- Designated CHISL: December 31, 2008
- Designated SFDL: August 23, 2002

The Colombo Building, also known as the Drexler Building or Drexler-Colombo Building, is a historic commercial building built in 1913, and is located at 1–21 Columbus Avenue in the Jackson Square Historic District in San Francisco, California.

The Colombo Building is listed as a San Francisco Designated Landmark since August 23, 2002; a listed California Historical Landmark since January 31, 2008; is listed as one of the National Register of Historic Places since January 31, 2008; and is part of the Jackson Square Historic District which was added to the National Register of Historic Places in 1971.

== History ==
The site of the building was the original location for the Bank of Italy, founded in 1904 by A. P. Giannini. During the 1906 San Francisco earthquake, the building was destroyed.

In 1913, the two-story building was commissioned by philanthropist Elise Drexler (1866–1951), and was designed by architects Reid & Reid in the Classical Revival-style. It was unusual for women to be philanthropists during this era, and the Columbo building (and Drexler's other commissioned buildings) served as a symbolic path towards in-powering women into independent living.

The Fugazi Bank Building (1909) by architect Charles Peter Paff served as an architectural design reference for the Colombo Building. These two buildings together are framing the gateway to Columbus Avenue and the North Beach neighborhood. The Columbus Savings Bank building, and the former Montgomery Block (now the location of the Transamerica Pyramid) are also located at this intersection.

The early occupants of the building included the Italian-American Realty; E. Jacopelli and Sons, auto dealers; Caeser Podoni & Company, insurance; and Joe Valvo, barber. It was once the location of Ramparts magazine.

City College of San Francisco had planned to create the Chinatown campus inside the Colombo Building, as the school had bought the property and neighboring property in the 1990s; but that plan was thwarted by Aaron Peskin and the Telegraph Hill Dwellers association.

== See also ==
- List of San Francisco Designated Landmarks
- National Register of Historic Places listings in San Francisco
