= Genella Building =

Historic building in San Francisco, California, US

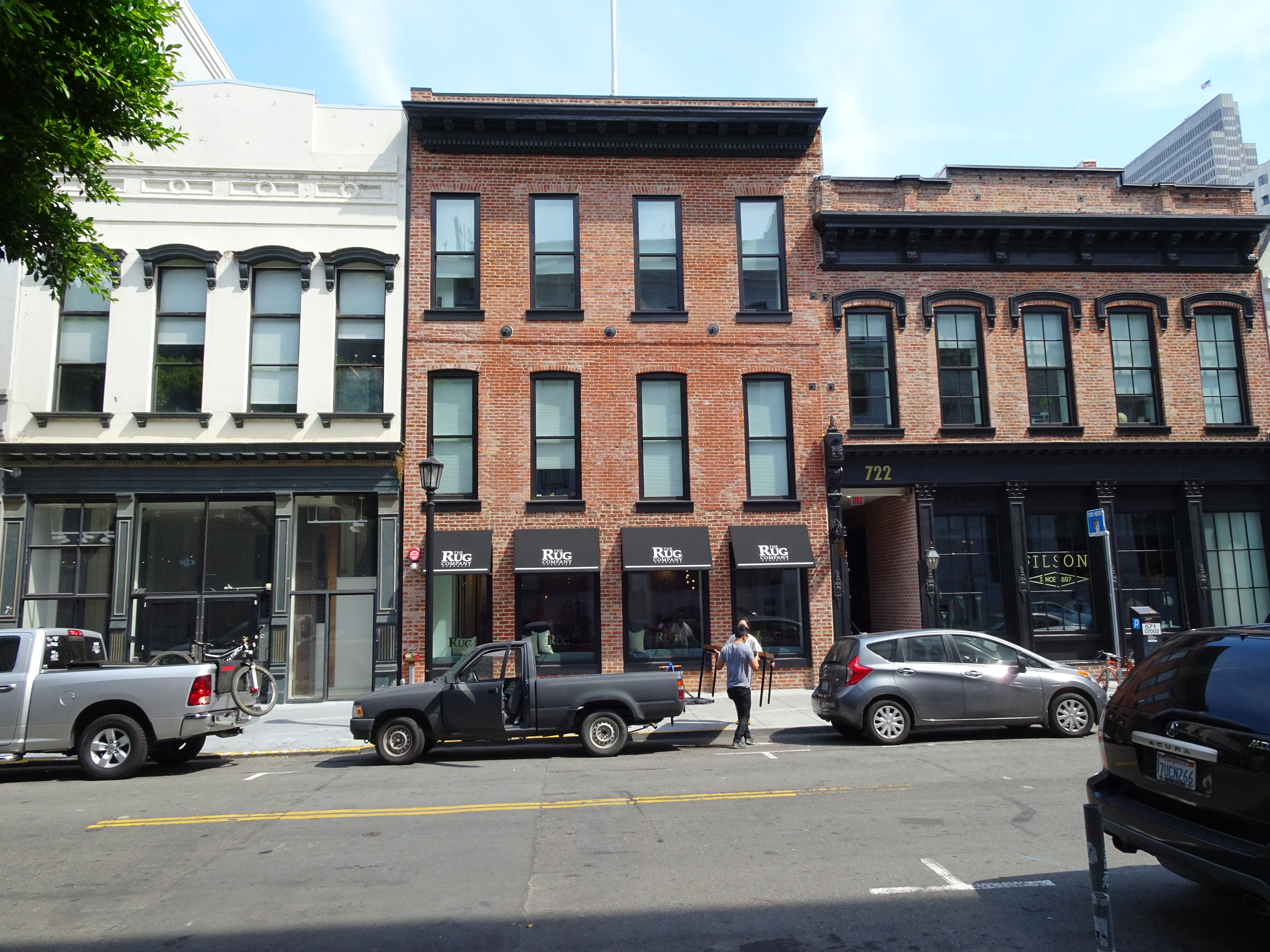
- Genella Building is the tall building in the middle
- Interactive map of Genella Building
- Location: 726–728 Montgomery Street, Jackson Square, San Francisco, California, U.S.
- Coordinates: 37.79613°N 122.40333°W
- Built: c. 1853

San Francisco Designated Landmark
- Designated: February 3, 1969
- Reference no.: 10

The Genella Building, also known as the Belli Annex, is a historic multi-use building, built c. 1853 in the Jackson Square neighborhood at 726–728 Montgomery Street in San Francisco, California. After the 1989 earthquake, the Genella Building and the adjacent the Belli Building (722–728 Montgomery Street) were damaged and left vacant for many years, and subsequently renovated together. Since 2015, these two buildings are an apartment building with only the façades saved, called 722 Montgomery.

The Genella Building has been listed as a San Francisco Designated Landmark (no. 10) since 1969, and is part of the Jackson Square Historic District. The Belli Building is listed separately as a San Francisco Designated Landmark (no. 9). The Genella Building site has a historical marker that states the first Masonic Lodge meeting in San Francisco was held on this site in 1849.

== History ==
The building was used for many diverse purposes, starting with a china and glassware business owned by Joseph Genella for roughly 10 years. It also served as a building for bullion dealers, merchandise brokers, a Spanish language newspaper called La Voz de Chile, and mining company offices. The upper floors were used as a meeting hall for the Odd Fellows, and other fraternal orders.

After the 1989 Loma Prieta earthquake, the brick Genella Building and the adjoining brick Belli Building were structurally damaged, and left vacant for 25 years. In 2000, permit plans were approved for a renovation. In 2015, it became an apartment complex.

== See also ==
- List of San Francisco Designated Landmarks
- Barbary Coast, San Francisco
