= Richard M. Hotaling =

American actor, playwright (1868–1925)

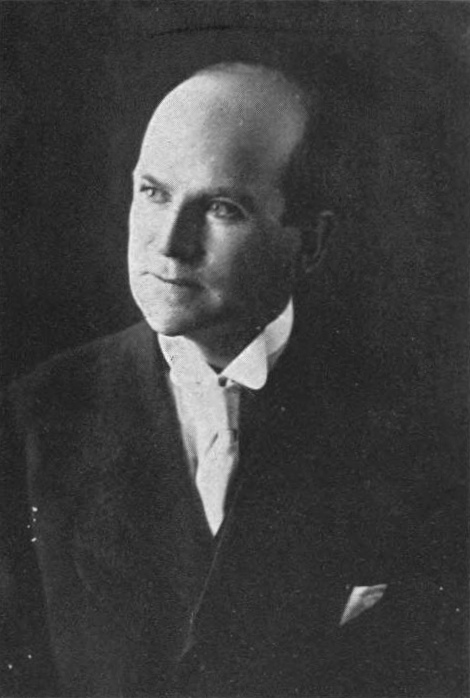
- Richard M. Hotaling (1915)

San Francisco Board of Supervisors
- In office 1900–1901
- Succeeded by: Fred N. Bent

Personal details
- Born: November 27, 1868 San Francisco, California, U.S.
- Died: November 14, 1925 (aged 56) San Francisco, California, U.S.
- Resting place: Cypress Lawn Memorial Park
- Parent: Anson Parsons Hotaling (father)
- Occupation: Stage actor, clubman, playwright, politician, insurance executive

Richard M. Hotaling (November 27, 1868 – November 14, 1925), commonly known as Dick Hotaling, was an American clubman, stage actor, playwright, and politician. He was from a pioneering family in San Francisco, California and the son of Anson Parsons Hotaling, a noted businessman and one of the richest people in California by 1900.

== Life and career ==
Richard M. Hotaling was born on November 27, 1868, in San Francisco, California. His parents were Lavinia Johnson (née Linen) and Anson Parsons "A.P." Hotaling.

For more than 20 years, Hotaling led an acting company and produced Shakespeare's dramas on stage. He was also a prominent member of the Bohemian Club, where he was active in their stage productions.

He served on the San Francisco Board of Supervisors from 1900–1901 under Mayor James D. Phelan.

His father A.P. Hotaling died in 1900 without will, and his wife Lavinia and son Richard battled in court for many years over the estate, worth an estimated US $5 million.

His father A.P. Hotaling had owned 1,900 acres (770 ha) of land in Marin County, California. After his father's death, Richard built and lived at Hotaling Mansion (1900) in Sleepy Hollow, Marin County, California. The house was designed for entertaining, and he maintained a herd of Holstein cattle from Holland there. In 1925 the Hotaling family sold the property and he moved back to San Francisco. After the sale the Hotaling Mansion was used as the clubhouse for Sleepy Hollow Golf Course, and later changed hands before it burned down in 1957 from suspected arson.

In February 1925, Hotaling was accused of murder-for-hire, allegedly to murder his mother Lavinia and his sister in-law Myrtle Fitzwater Hotaling, who was married to his brother Frederick. The case was in national news, and was brought before a grand jury. In March 1925, the grand jury rejected the evidence as "worthless" and the case was dismissed.

== Death ==
Hotaling died from leucocythemia (now known as acute myeloid leukemia) on November 14, 1925, in San Francisco. He had never married. He was buried at Cypress Lawn Memorial Park in Colma.

== Publications ==
- Hotaling, Richard M. (1918). The Twilight Of The Kings; A Mask Of Democracy (play). Wallace A. Sabin (music), George Sterling (lyrics, excepting Song of love). San Francisco, California: Bohemian Club.
