= Fugazi Bank Building =

1909 historic building in San Francisco, US

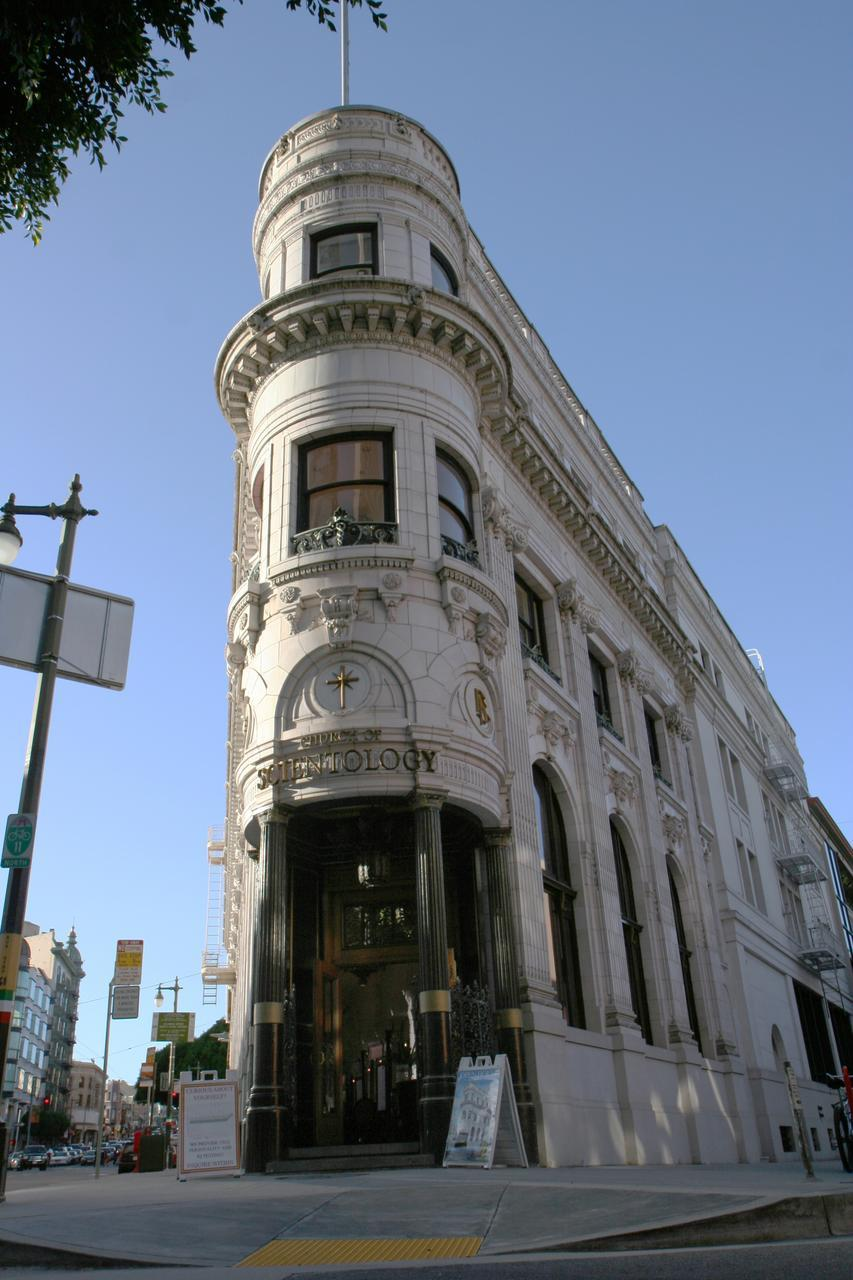

- Location within San Francisco County Location within California Location within the United States
- 37.795839°N 122.403692°W
- Location: 4 Columbus Avenue, San Francisco, California, 94111, U.S.

History
- Built: 1909

Site notes
- Architect: Charles Peter Paff
- Architectural style: Classical Revival

San Francisco Designated Landmark
- Designated: March 5, 1973
- Reference no.: 52

The Fugazi Bank Building, also known as the Fugazi Banca Popolare Operaia Italiana Building, and Old Transamerica Building, is a historic commercial building built in 1909, and located at 4 Columbus Avenue in the Jackson Square Historic District of San Francisco, California.

The Fugazi Bank Building has been listed as a San Francisco Designated Landmark since March 5, 1973; and is part of the Jackson Square Historic District which was added to the National Register of Historic Places in 1971.

== History ==
The Fugazi Bank Building was designed by architect Charles Peter Paff (1865–1942) and was originally flat-iron-shaped and standing at two stories, with a cupola at its sharp point, but the cupola was removed, and a third story was later added. The building has a white terra cotta-cladding.

The building was a design reference point for the Reid & Reids' Colombo Building (1913; also known as the Drexler-Colombo Building), located nearby at 1 Columbus Avenue, with a mirroring building shape. These two buildings together frame the gateway to Columbus Avenue and the North Beach neighborhood.

Giovanni "John" Fugazi (1838–1916) originally built the structure in 1909 to hold the Banca Popolare Operaia Italiana Popular Italiana Bank. A.P. Giannini had been a member of the Fugazi Bank's board of directors early in his career and before founding the Bank of Italy. He later purchased the building, which served as the headquarters of his Transamerica Corporation (founded in 1928). Since November 2003, the building has been owned by the Church of Scientology.

== See also ==
- Italian American Bank
- List of San Francisco Designated Landmarks
