= Anson Parsons Hotaling =

American businessman (1827–1900)

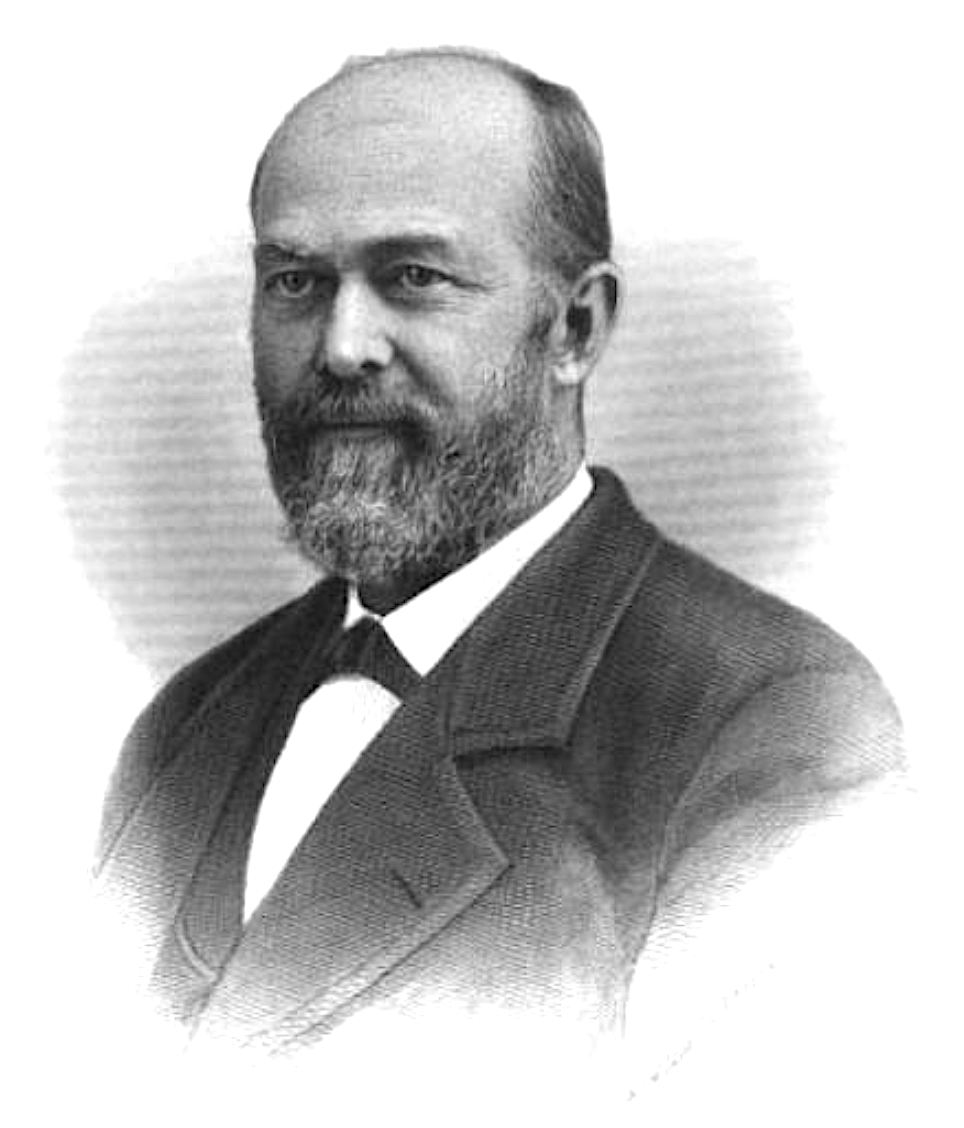
- Engraving of Hotaling, c. 1881
- Born: February 28, 1827; New Baltimore, Greene County, New York, U.S.
- Died: February 16, 1900 (aged 72); San Francisco, California, U.S.
- Other names: A. P. Hotaling, Anson Parsons Houghtaling
- Occupations: Businessman, merchant, real estate developer, banker
- Political party: Democratic
- Spouse: Lavinia Johnson Linen (m. 1863)
- Children: 4, including Richard M. Hotaling

Signature
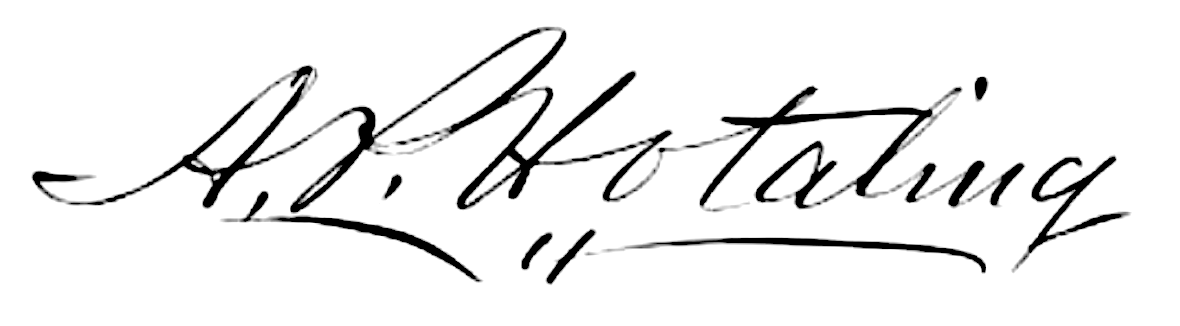

Anson Parsons Hotaling, or Houghtaling (February 28, 1827 – February 16, 1900) was an American businessman, merchant and real estate developer in San Francisco. He commonly went by the name A. P. Hotaling.

== Early life and family ==
Anson Parsons Hotaling was born on February 28, 1827, in a town called New Baltimore in Greene County, New York. Hotaling was the third son and sixth child of Garrit A. Ho(u)ghtaling (1789 –1876) and Hanna Parsons (1789–1880), his surname ultimately deriving from the Dutch surname Hoogteijling. His relatives were from Holland and England.

Born and raised in rural New York state, he left school early to work on his father's farm. In his 20s he found an interest in photography.

== California and career ==
Hotaling sailed for San Francisco in February to July 1852, on the "Race Hound" ship. The route at that time was around Cape Horn, and his ship put into several South American cities for provisioning, including Valparaíso, Chile. He was tempted to stay in South America, but continued on to San Francisco.

Once in California, he briefly tried his hand at mining but within a year returned to San Francisco, and opened a wine and spirit business, owned in partnership. By 1866, his business had much expanded and he was sole owner and operator.

He began a shipping venture, trading with both the South Sea islands, and the settlements on the Pacific coast of Russia. Later he expanded his trade to Australia. He bought a considerable amount of real estate throughout the states of California, Oregon, and Washington. He also invested in iron and mercury mining operations, and created the village of Hotaling in Placer County, California.

Hotaling was the owner of the Hotel St. George in Santa Cruz, California. Additionally he owned a bank in San Rafael, California.

He married Lavinia Johnson Linen on November 3, 1863. They had four sons. His son, Richard M. Hotaling (1868–1925) was a playwright and he served on the San Francisco Board of Supervisors, from 1900–1901.

He was active in the Odd Fellows and other Masonic societies. During the Civil War (1861–1865), Hotaling was a Union army supporting Democrat.

== Death and legacy ==
Hotaling died of heart failure and an unknown illness on February 16, 1900, in his home at 1776 California Street in Lower Pacific Heights, San Francisco.

Two of Hotaling's four sons predeceased him. After Hotaling's death he did not leave a will, and his wife Lavinia and son Richard battled in court for many years over the estate, worth an estimated $5 million.

Hotaling Place, a one-block lane in the Jackson Square Historic District that has been called "San Francisco's oldest alley", is named after him. Hotaling maintained a warehouse there for his whiskey business, now called the Hotaling Building. The whiskey may have helped saving the building in the 1906 earthquake and fire, as commemorated in a poem by Charles K. Field that today is displayed on a plaque there:

"If, as they say, God spanked the town
For being over-frisky,
Why did He burn His churches down
And spare Hotaling's whiskey?"

== See also ==
- Hotaling Annex West
