= Hotaling Building =

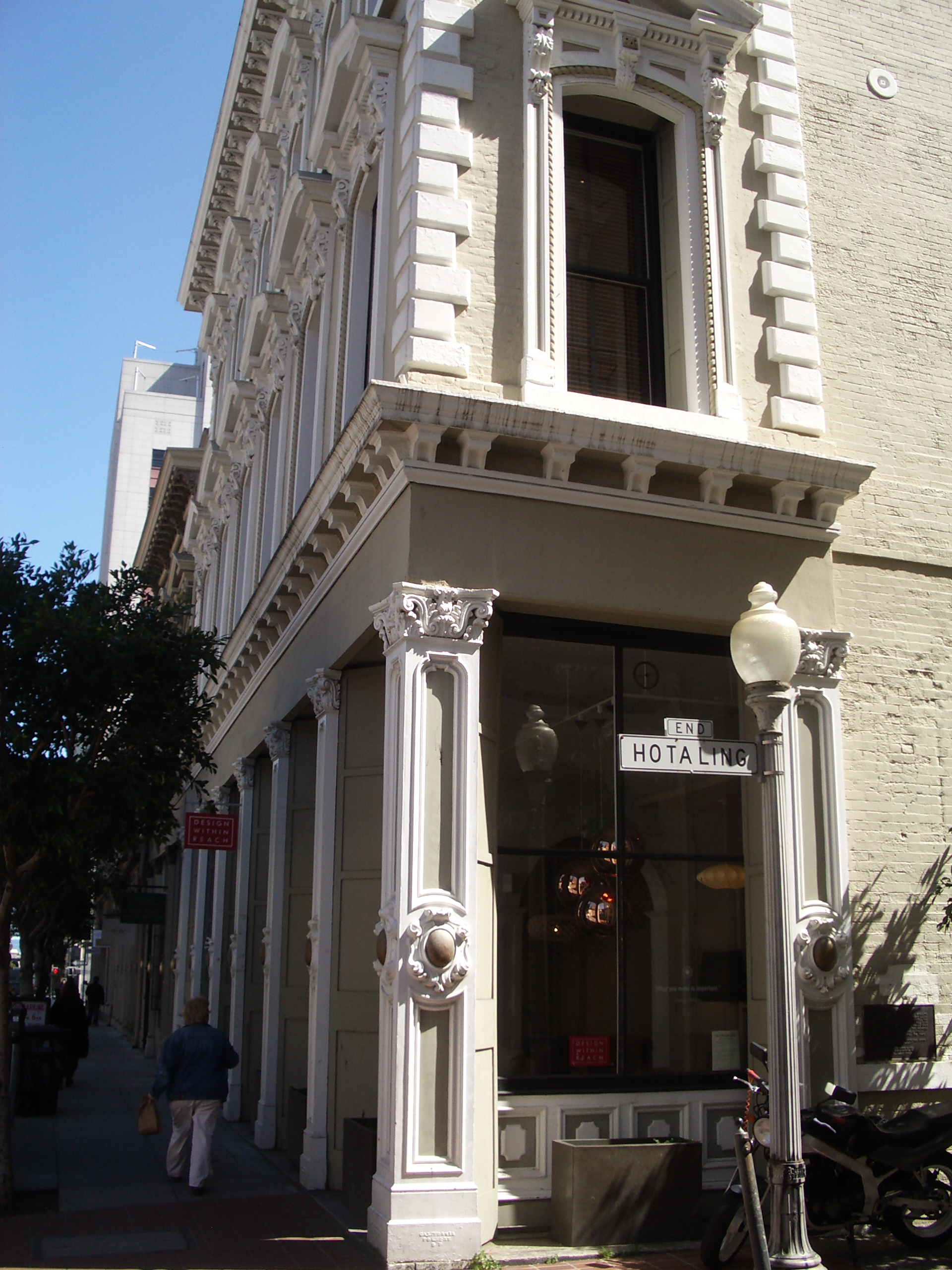
- Hotaling Building in 2008.

- Location within San Francisco County
- 37.7964°N 122.4028°W
- Location: 451 Jackson Street; San Francisco, California

History
- Built: 1866

San Francisco Designated Landmark
- Designated: 1969
- Reference no.: 12

The Hotaling Building is a historic building located at 451 Jackson Street in Jackson Square, San Francisco, California. It is a San Francisco Designated Landmark (no. 12) since 1969, and is part of the Jackson Square Historic District.

The Hotaling Annex East is the next door building at 445 Jackson Street which used to serve as the horse stables for the Hotaling Building, and it is listed separately as a San Francisco Designated Landmark (no. 13) since 1969. The Hotaling Stables Building is in the alley next door at 32–42 Hotaling Place, and it also served as the stables, and it is also listed separately as a San Francisco Designated Landmark (no. 11) since 1969.

== History ==
It was built in 1866 by Anson Parsons Hotaling to originally be a hotel. However, Hotaling later moved to the whiskey business. It housed the Hotaling & Co. which imported whiskey from Kentucky to create its own branded bourbon blends (J.H. Cutter and Old Kirk) for local distribution.

It is located along Hotaling Place (formerly Jones Alley) is the street adjacent to the building that runs along the old city shoreline.

The building façade is Italianate with cast iron and cast iron shutters, a fire-resistant type of construction. It was also one of the few surviving buildings after the 1906 Earthquake and Fire, thanks to a mile long fire hose that stretched through Fisherman's Wharf and Telegraph Hill. As the California Powder Works was blowing up buildings to create fire breaks, the employees of Hotaling & Co. rallied to move between 3,000 and 5,000 barrels from the Hotaling Building to a safer area, an empty lot where the new customhouse was under construction. It remained one of the only alcohol stocks not destroyed by the authorities after the disaster.

Because of the saving of the building, Charles K. Field once stated famously, "If, as they say, God spanked the town for being over-frisky, why did He burn His churches down and spare Hotaling's whiskey?" Hotaling became one of the rare distributors of liquor in San Francisco still standing after the earthquake.

== Closure and legacy ==
Hotaling & Co. left the building in 1943 and closed. The company remained an active player of the local alcohol industry through a resurrection by the Anchor Brewing Company, which was sold to Sapporo in 2017.

The building was revived in 1952 when Dorothy Kneedler Lawenda and Harry Lawenda of Kneedler-Fauchere purchased it and made it a center for their wholesale interior decorative design elements firm. The name Jackson Square was adopted, many buildings were renovated and the street became the interior design center for San Francisco for decades.

== See also ==
- List of San Francisco Designated Landmarks
