= Jackson Square, San Francisco =

Jackson Square
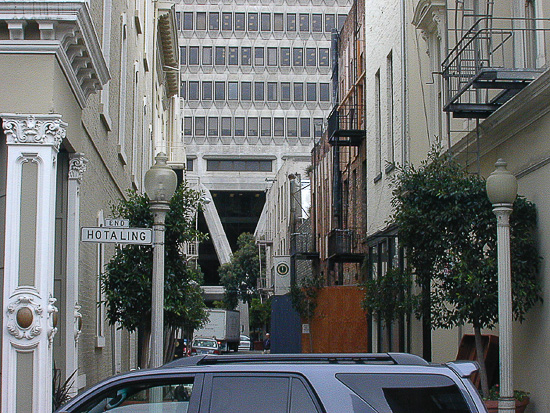
- Hotaling Place at Jackson St., San Francisco--the historic warehouse that gives the alley its name is hinted at left, and the Transamerica Pyramid appears in the background

- Location within Central San Francisco
- Coordinates: 37.7964°N 122.402908°W
- Country: United States
- State: California
- City: San Francisco
- Jackson Square Historic District
- U.S. National Register of Historic Places
- U.S. Historic district
- Location: Roughly bounded by Broadway on N, Sansome St. on E, Washington St. on S, and Columbus Ave. on W, San Francisco, California
- Area: 14.2 acres (5.7 ha)
- Architectural style: Classical Revival, Italianate
- NRHP reference No.: 71000186
- Added to NRHP: November 18, 1971

Jackson Square Historic District is an area in downtown San Francisco, California. It dates back to the city's earliest years and the 1849 gold rush, and is known for its historic commercial buildings in the classical revival and Italianate styles.

The Jackson Square Historic District was added to the National Register of Historic Places in November 18, 1971, with periods of significance spanning from 1850 to 1924.

== Definition ==
Jackson Square Historic District is bounded approximately by Broadway on the north, Washington Street on the south, Columbus Ave. on the west and Sansome Street on the east. Jackson Street runs through it.

According to the 2010 neighborhoods map of the San Francisco Association of Realtors (SFAR), Jackson Square Historic District lies within the Financial District/Barbary Coast neighborhood. However, according to a 2006 definition by the city mayor's Office of Neighborhood Services, the area forms part of the North Beach neighborhood.

== History ==
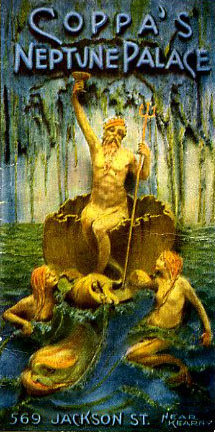
Ad for Coppa's Neptune Palace nightclub, 569 Jackson St., circa 1913. In 1914, "throngs gathered nightly to dance and eat until the police commissioners closed all of these resorts, as well as Barbary Coast."

Jackson Square encompasses the northeastern part of the former Barbary Coast red light district. It contains several buildings that survived the 1906 earthquake.

Hotaling Place, a one-block lane near the end of Columbus Avenue that used to lie on the city's shoreline, has been called, "San Francisco's oldest alley." It is named after businessman Anson Parsons Hotaling, who maintained a warehouse on the lane for his whiskey, which may have helped saving the building in the 1906 earthquake and fire, as commemorated in a poem by Charles K. Field that today is displayed on a plaque there:

"If, as they say, God spanked the town,
For being over-frisky,
Why did He burn His churches down
And spare Hotaling's Whiskey?"

== Notable buildings and historical locations ==
- Colombo Building, 1-21 Columbus Avenue
- Fugazi Bank Building, 4 Columbus Avenue
- Grogan-Lent-Atherton Building, 400 Jackson Street
- Ghirardelli Building, 407 Jackson Street
- Hotaling Building, 451 Jackson Street
- Hotaling Annex East, 445 Jackson Street
- Hotaling Annex West, 463–473 Jackson Street
- Belli Building, 722–728 Montgomery Street
- Genella Building, 726–728 Montgomery Street
- California Masonic Lodge No. 1, 728 Montgomery Street
- Golden Era Building, 732–734 Montgomery Street
- First Jewish religious services in San Francisco, 735 Montgomery Street
- Bank of Lucas, Turner & Co., NE corner of Montgomery and Jackson
