= The Outcasts of Poker Flat (disambiguation) =

The Outcasts of Poker Flat is a short story, written in 1869 by Bret Harte.

It may also refer to one of several film adaptations:

- The Outcasts of Poker Flat (1919 film)
- The Outcasts of Poker Flat (1937 film)
- The Outcasts of Poker Flat (1952 film)
- The Outcasts of Poker Flat (1958 film)
