= The Tales of the Argonauts =

The Tales of the Argonauts is a volume of short stories published by Bret Harte in 1875. The title is sometimes loosely applied to all Harte's stories of early California.

== Description ==
Nothing in the Tales of the Argonauts proper quite equals in merit "The Luck of Roaring Camp", "The Outcasts of Poker Flat" and "Tennessee's Partner", which had appeared in an earlier collection; but "An Iliad of Sandy Bar", "How Santa Claus Came to Simpson's Bar", and some others have been deservedly popular.

The Argonauts are the gold seekers of 1849 and the years immediately following. These adventurers came from all quarters of the globe and all ranks of society, and they had in common only the possession of the strength and determination necessary to reach the new Colchis. Here they lived, at first, wholly free from the conventional restraints imposed by an organized society, and each man showed himself for what he was. Many of these primitive social conditions still existed when Harte went to California in 1854, and they made a great impression on the observant boy. He did not use them in literature, however, until he was able to look back on them in the light of experience.

A list of the short stories published in an 1876 version published by James R. Osgood and Company follows:

- The Rose of Tuolumne.
- A Passage in the Life of Mr. John Oakhurst.
- Wan Lee, the Pagan (September 1874).
- How Old Man Plunkett Went Home.
- The Fool of Five Forks.
- Baby Sylvester.
- An Episode of Fiddletown.
- A Jersey Centenarian.

== Criticism ==
Californians objected that his pictures were unreal; but they give the impression of essential truth to life—an impression not spoiled by his persistent habit of showing the good elements in even the lowest and most debased characters. Harte occasionally seems to have adopted some of the less fortunate devices of Charles Dickens, but his manner was chiefly his own. He lacks literary finish, though he was painstaking in regard to style; but in these early tales he has a sure command of humor and pathos, and a complete mastery of his unique material.
