= The Luck of Roaring Camp =

- Short story by Bret Harte
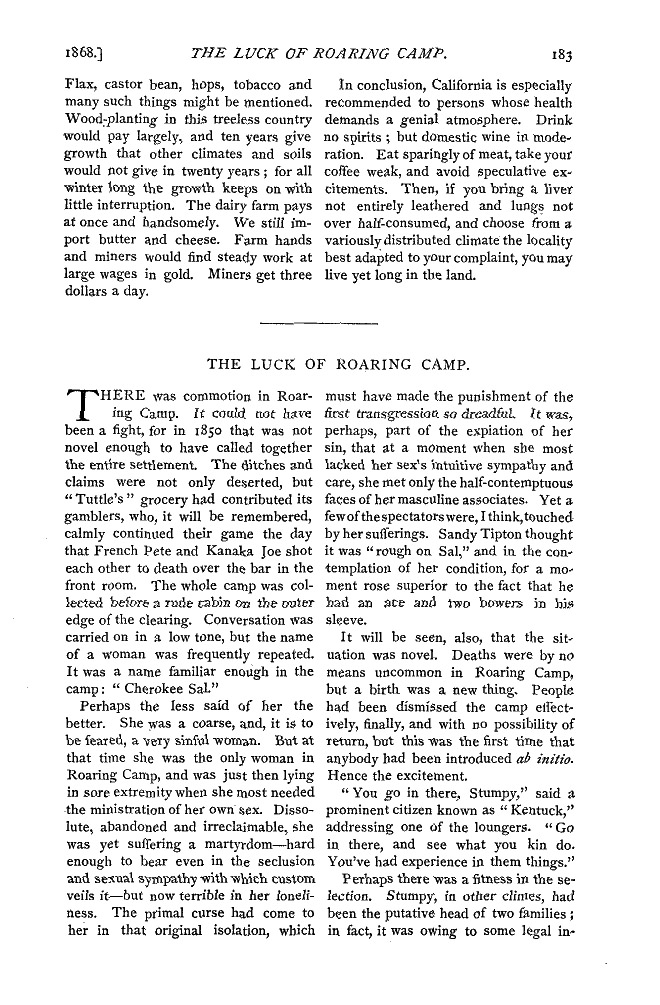
- "The Luck of Roaring Camp" as it appeared in the Overland Monthly
- Country: United States
- Language: English
- Genre: Western fiction

Publication
- Published in: Overland Monthly
- Publication type: Magazine
- Publisher: Anton Roman
- Media type: Print
- Publication date: August 1868

"The Luck of Roaring Camp" is a short story by American author Bret Harte. It was first published in the August 1868 issue of the Overland Monthly and helped push Harte to international prominence.

The story is about the birth of a baby boy in a 19th-century gold prospecting camp.

Roaring Camp was a real place. It was a gold mining settlement on the Mokelumne River in Amador County, California. It was home to forty-niners seeking gold in and around the river; it is now a privately owned tourist attraction. The story's flood theme may have been inspired by California's Great Flood of 1862, which Harte witnessed.

== Plot summary ==
The story takes place in a small struggling mining town located in the foothills of the California mountains at the time of the gold rush. The camp is suffering from a long string of bad luck. With only one woman in their midst, it seems as though the miners have no future. The boy's mother, Cherokee Sal, dies in childbirth, so the men of Roaring Camp must raise the boy themselves. Believing the child to be a good luck charm, the miners christen him Thomas Luck.

"Thomas Luck" is the first newborn the camp has seen in ages; things are looking up. The miners decide to refine their behavior and refrain from gambling and fighting. They become cheerful, the foliage begins to grow, and there is talk of building a hotel to attract outsiders. Unfortunately, the hope is wiped out by the sudden death of Luck in a flood. Water brought gold to the gulches, giving miners their first glimmer of hope. And water takes away what seems their last glimmer—Luck.

== Characters ==
Thomas Luck
The newborn child thought to be the savior of the camp
Kentuck
A rugged prospector who tries to save Thomas Luck's life in the flood
Cherokee Sal
Mother of Thomas Luck; only woman in camp
Stumpy
Guardian of Thomas Luck
Oakhurst
A gambler who gives Thomas Luck his name. (This may be the same character as the John Oakhurst of Harte's short story "The Outcasts of Poker Flat".)

== Publication history ==
Bret Harte and his colleague Anton Roman at the Overland Monthly were in Santa Cruz, California when "The Luck of Roaring Camp" was set in type in the summer of 1868. The proofreader in their absence, Sarah B. Cooper, objected to some of the content in the story. She particularly disliked the use of a prostitute character and the expletives spoken by the miners. Cooper brought her concerns to the printer, who agreed with her and contacted Roman, the owner. He began to worry about the potential controversy over the story's morality and the harm it would cause to the new Overland Monthly in its second issue. Roman later claimed he supported Harte from the beginning, but that Harte was willing to make the editorial changes without question until Roman's wife read the tale and approved of it. Harte called those claims "lies" in 1879. Fellow Overland contributor Ina Coolbrith recalled there was a confrontation between the two at the time and that Harte threatened to resign.

"The Luck of Roaring Camp" was soon included as the centerpiece of Harte's collection The Luck of Roaring Camp and Other Sketches. The compilation was published by James T. Fields of Fields, Osgood, & Co. at about the same time that Harte's poem "The Heathen Chinee" was published. Those simultaneous publications caused Harte's popularity to skyrocket nearly overnight and Fields offered Harte a $10,000 exclusive contract to contribute to The Atlantic Monthly. After the collection's publication in April 1870, Fields rushed a compilation of Harte's poetry for the Christmas market to capitalize on the success of "The Heathen Chinee".

== Analysis and response ==
Local presses in California were unimpressed by "The Luck of Roaring Camp". The Alta California, for example, described it simply as "a pleasant little sketch". Publications closer to the east coast, however, soon raised the story's popularity. The Springfield Republican called it "a genuine California story" that was "so true to nature and so deep-reaching in its humor, that it will move the hearts of men everywhere". Mark Twain wrote in the Buffalo Express that it was "the best prose magazine article that has seen the light for many months on either side of the ocean". It was only after these endorsements that "The Luck of Roaring Camp" found a strong audience in California. "Since Boston endorsed the story, San Francisco was properly proud of it", Harte wrote.

Years after its publication, Harte said that conservative readers thought the story lacked morality: "Christians were cautioned against pollution by its contract", he wrote, and "business men were gravely urged to condemn and frown upon this picture of California society that was not conducive to Eastern immigrants."

However, the book was designated No. 40 in the Zamorano 80 list of distinguished books on California, the synopsis being, according to Leslie E. Bliss, Chief Librarian at Huntington Library (1924-1958): "The author wrote these sketches "to illustrate an era" and was later criticized for having romanticized rather than having realistically depicted life "in the diggings." Nevertheless, one cannot imagine a bibliography of outstanding California literature that does not include this little volume."

== Adaptations ==
There have been several short film adaptations of "The Luck of Roaring Camp", and a small number of feature films.

The first film adaptation was The Luck of Roaring Camp (1910), which was a short film produced by the Thomas Edison Motion Picture Company. The film was adapted and directed by character actor Frank McGlynn Sr.; his son Thomas played the role of Tommy Luck. Paramount Pictures produced a Will Rogers adaptation, Roaring Camp, in 1916, featuring L. Frank Baum as Oakhurst.

Some of the other adaptations are:

- The Luck of Roaring Camp (1917), an Edison adaptation by Edward H. Griffith that stars Ivan Christy and Eugene Field
- The Outcasts of Poker Flat (1937), an RKO Pictures adaptation by John Twist that stars Virginia Weidler and Si Jenks
- Luck of Roaring Camp (1937), a Monogram Pictures adaptation by Harvey Gates that stars Byron Foulger and Ferris Taylor
- Four of the Apocalypse (1975), a Spaghetti Western based in part on Harte's story.
- California Gold Rush (1981), a Schick Sunn adaptation by Thomas C. Chapman that stars Ken Curtis and Robert Hays
