= The Outcasts of Poker Flat (1919 film) =

1919 film directed by John Ford

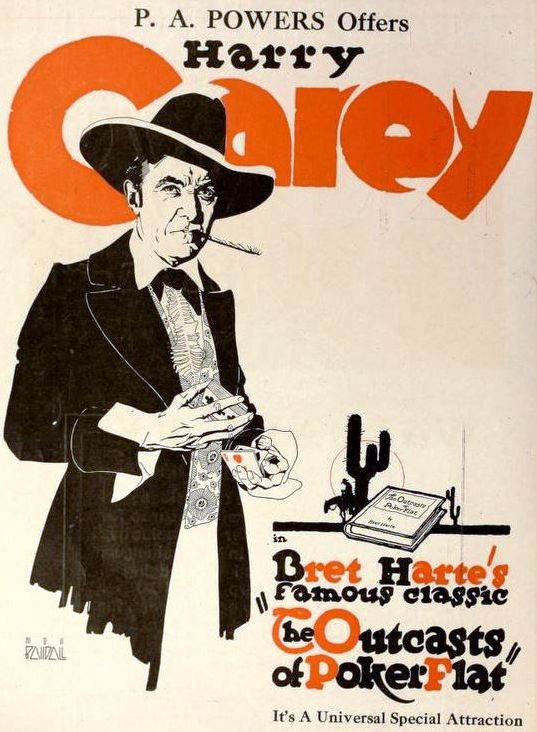
- Advert for film
- Directed by: John Ford
- Written by: H. Tipton Steck
- Based on: The Outcasts of Poker Flat; 1868 story in The Overland Monthly by Bret Harte
- Produced by: Pat Powers
- Starring: Harry Carey
- Cinematography: John W. Brown
- Distributed by: Universal Film Manufacturing Company
- Release date: June 29, 1919
- Running time: 60 minutes
- Country: United States
- Languages: Silent; English intertitles

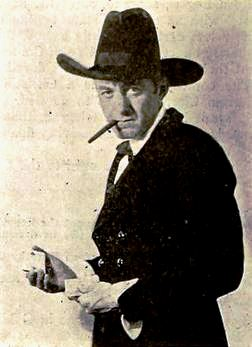
Harry Carey as the gambler

The Outcasts of Poker Flat is a 1919 American silent Western film directed by John Ford and featuring Harry Carey. The film is considered to be lost. The screenplay is based upon the 1869 story of the same name by Bret Harte. Harte's story has been brought to film at least five times, including in 1937 with Preston Foster and in 1952 with Dale Robertson.

== Plot ==
As described in a film magazine, Square Shootin' Harry Lanyon, proprietor of a gambling hall in Arizona, is in love with his ward Ruth Watson. However, he believes that she is in love with his pal Billy Lanyon, and intends to let the youth have the girl. While in this uncertain mind about his own love affair, Harry begins to read Bret Harte's story "The Outcasts of Poker Flat" and begins to liken himself to John Oakhurst in the story. Oakhurst befriends a girl named Sophy on a riverboat. The girl is being deserted by a gambler named Ned Stratton, who had promised to marry her, and Oakhurst saves her from self-destruction. Oakhurst brings Sophy to the questionable neighborhood of Poker Flat, and encourages her to marry some youth who loves her, although Oakhurst also cares for her. Stratton reappears and Oakhurst makes it his business to rid the camp of him. Later, the Vigilantes swoop down upon Poker Flat and, in a reform movement, send Oakhurst, Mother Shipton, the Duchess, and others into the hills. Sophy and her young husband follow. They are all caught in a violent storm from which only the latter two emerge alive. Harry Lanyon is impressed with the Bret Harte story, and vows that he will not repeat the mistake of Oakhurst and in sacrificing his love for another. Harry then discovers that Ruth loves him and not Billy after all.

== Cast ==
- Harry Carey as Harry "Square Shootin' Harry" Lanyon/John Oakhurst
- Cullen Landis as Billy Lanyon/Tommy Oakhurst
- Gloria Hope as Ruth Watson/Sophy, The Girl
- Joseph Harris as Ned Stratton
- Virginia Chester
- Duke R. Lee
- Louise Lester
- J. Farrell MacDonald
- Charles H. Mailes
- Vester Pegg
- Vic Potel

== Reception ==
Variety's review was positive, finding it to be a worthy adaption of the source material despite the changes made to the story.

== See also ==
- List of lost films
