= Harry Segall =

American screenwriter

Harry Segall (April 10, 1892 – November 25, 1975) was an American playwright, screenwriter and television writer. Harry Segall was born in Chicago.

Harry Segall's writing career spans 1933 to 1959. Segall's plays, including Lost Horizons, appeared on Broadway in the mid-1930s. In 1933, Metro-Goldwyn-Mayer brought Segall to Hollywood as a contract writer. In 1936, he moved to RKO Pictures where he wrote and co-wrote screenplays for films such as The Outcasts of Poker Flat, based on a story by Bret Harte and Blind Alibi, starring Richard Dix. During this time, Paramount Pictures and Universal Studios also produced his screenplays.

In 1941, Segall won an Academy Award for best original story for the film Here Comes Mr. Jordan, starring Robert Montgomery and Evelyn Keyes, based on Segall's play Heaven Can Wait. The play was later revived under the title Wonderful Journey, but the revival lasted only nine performances.

A Technicolor sequel to Here Comes Mr. Jordan, Down to Earth was released in 1947 starring Rita Hayworth and Larry Parks.

A 1978 film version of Heaven Can Wait starred Warren Beatty and Julie Christie, and the play was then filmed again as Down to Earth, a 2001 vehicle for Chris Rock, with Segall credited as the writer of the original story.

With the advent of television, Segall turned his writing talents to this medium, writing plots for TV series and Playhouse 90. He retired from screenwriting in 1959 and died November 25, 1975, in Woodland Hills, California. Segall was interred in Roosevelt Cemetery, in Gardena, California.

== Selected filmography ==
- Two Yanks in Trinidad (1942)
- Angel on My Shoulder (1946)
- Monkey Business (1952)
