= Tassin =

Tassin is a French name:

== Surname ==
- André Tassin (1902–1986), French footballer
- Abel Tassin d'Alonne (1646–1723), Dutch courtier and diplomat
- Augustus Gabriel de Vivier Tassin (1842–1893), French-born American soldier in the American Civil War
- Christophe Tassin (died 1660), French cartographer
- Eloi Tassin (1912–1977), French professional bicycle racer
- René-Prosper Tassin (1697–1777), French historian
- Thierry Tassin (born 1959), Belgian racing driver

== Other uses ==
- Tassin-la-Demi-Lune, a French commune in Auvergne-Rhône-Alpes
- Tassin FC, French football club
