= The Heathen Chinee =

Poem

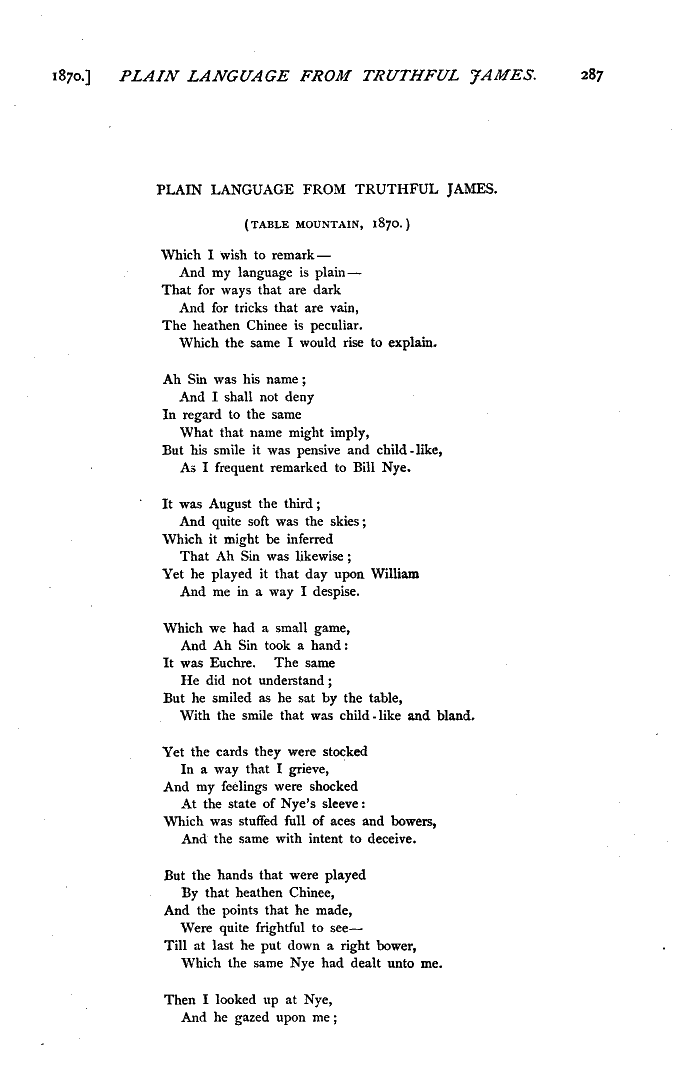
"Plain Language from Truthful James", as it first appeared in the Overland Monthly, September 1870

"The Heathen Chinee", originally published as "Plain Language from Truthful James", is a narrative poem by American writer Bret Harte. It was published for the first time in September 1870 in the Overland Monthly. It was written as a parody of Algernon Charles Swinburne's Atalanta in Calydon (1865), and satirized anti-Chinese sentiment in northern California.

The poem became popular and was frequently republished. To Harte's dismay, however, the poem reinforced racism among his readers instead of challenging it as he intended. Nevertheless, he returned to the character years later. The poem also inspired or influenced several adaptations.

== Overview ==
The narrative of the poem focuses on a Chinese immigrant character named Ah Sin who defeats an Irish immigrant named William Nye in a high-stakes game of euchre. William Nye is a cheater, whom the "childlike" Ah Sin successfully out-cheats. William Nye realizes nothing until it is too late. Upon realizing he was cheated, William Nye attacks Ah Sin.

Harte's narrative presented a fictionalized account of anti-Chinese attacks and intended his readers to sympathize with Ah Sin.

== Composition and publication history ==
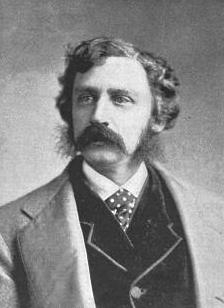
Bret Harte in 1871, about a year after publishing "The Heathen Chinee"

Harte wrote the poem as an afterthought and did not initially intend to publish it. According to Mark Twain, Harte wrote the poem "for his own amusement" and "threw it aside, but being one day suddenly called upon for copy he sent that very piece in." In writing the poem, Harte echoed and, therefore, lampooned Algernon Charles Swinburne's 1865 verse tragedy Atalanta in Calydon. Ambrose Bierce claimed Harte originally sent it to him to include in his San Francisco-based News Letter, but he suggested it was better suited for Harte's own journal, the Overland Monthly. It appeared there under its original title, "Plain Language from Truthful James" in the September 1870 issue. A Boston newspaper republished the work in 1871 as "The Heathen Chinee" and others have since used that name.

The poem was republished several times within a short period, including in New York Evening Post, Prairie Farmer, New York Tribune, Boston Evening Transcript, Providence Journal, Hartford Courant, and Saturday Evening Post (published twice). The poem was also included in a book by Harte titled Poems, released in January 1871. Several periodicals and books would republish the poem with illustrations.

In April 1870, James T. Fields had published a collection of Harte's stories, The Luck of Roaring Camp and Other Sketches through the Fields, Osgood, & Co. imprint. After the sudden success of "The Heathen Chinee", Fields rushed to produce a collection of Harte's poetry in time for the Christmas market; its first six editions sold out in five days.

The character of Ah Sin was revived for a theatrical play co-written by Harte and Twain, Ah Sin. The two writers had a rift by February 1877 just before completing a final draft. Twain took over the project and, as he wrote to William Dean Howells, he "left hardly a foot-print of Harte in it". Harte nevertheless attended the play's opening at the National Theatre in Washington, D.C., on May 7, 1877.

Near the end of his life, Harte used the characters of both Truthful James and Ah Sin in his poem "Free Silver at Angel's", a satirical response to the silver plank in the 1896 Democratic National Convention platform. Even so, when asked about the original poem in later years, Harte called the poem "trash", and "the worst poem I ever wrote, possibly the worst poem anyone ever wrote."

== Response ==
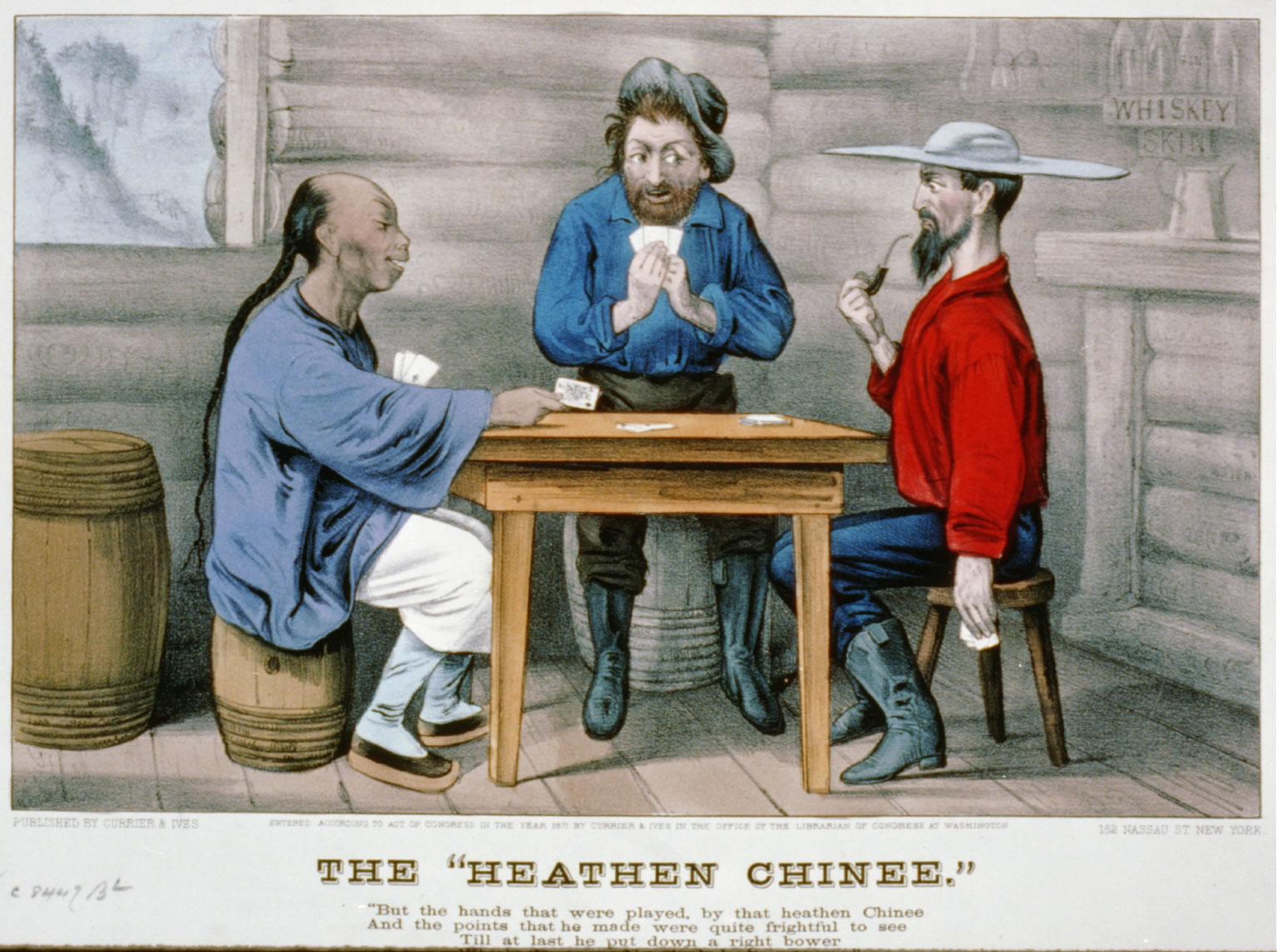
c.1871 Currier & Ives lithograph

"Plain Language from Truthful James" (or "The Heathen Chinee") was very popular among general readers. One New York newspaper reported on the frenzy over the poem: "Strolling down Broadway... we saw a crowd of men and boys, of high and low degree, swarming about a shop-window, pushing, laughing, and struggling... Elbowing our way through the crowd, we discovered an illustrated copy of Bret Harte's poem 'The Heathen Chinee.'"

The poem's popularity came, in part, from the ambiguity over its racial message. The narrator implies that the cheating of the Chinese man was no worse than that of the white man, but the irony was too subtle for general readers. The message matched one Harte had written elsewhere in exposing white people's hypocrisy. As he wrote later, the Chinese "did as the Caucasian did in all respects, and, being more patient and frugal, did it a little better".

Harte had repeatedly opposed anti-Chinese sentiment since as early as 1863, both privately and publicly. In 1866, for example, he wrote a letter defending the "peaceable citizens" of San Francisco's Chinatown who were "patient under abuse, and that patience, I am ashamed to say, they have to exercise continually in California". After the discovery of a murdered woman in Chinatown, whose cause of death was uncertain, Harte wrote, "as her head was caved in it is thought by some physicians that she died of galloping Christianity of the malignant California type". His 1874 short story Wan Lee, the Pagan attacked stereotypes about Chinese immigrants and sought to portray white Americans as the true savages.

In this vein, Harte intended "Plain Language from Truthful James" to be a satire of the prevalent prejudice among Irish laborers in northern California against the Chinese immigrants competing for the same work. He intended for the reader to sympathize with the victim, Ah Sin. However, the predominantly white middle-class readership of the Overland and the periodicals that reprinted it interpreted and embraced the poem as mocking the Chinese. These immigrants had been drawn in by the California Gold Rush and a boom in labor jobs, but relations with American-born citizens were tense. The more recent economic downturn in California had made tensions even worse. Readers took certain phrases of the poem out of context, including "we are ruined by Chinese cheap labor!", and used the poem to reinforce their own racism. They sympathized with Ah Sin's attacker, William Nye.

The poem was also frequently parodied. The poem "Three Aces", signed "Carl Byng", was published in the Buffalo Express in December 1870, not long after "Plain Language from Truthful James" first appeared. The poem was widely attributed to Mark Twain and labeled a "feeble imitation" of Harte. Twain angrily denied the charge and demanded a retraction, writing to the editor Thomas Bailey Aldrich, "I am not in the imitation business". Harte, in turn, targeted Twain years later in his 1893 story "Ingénue of the Sierras" by creating an unsavory character named "Charley Bing", modeled after Twain. The incident was one of several in a long rivalry between the two authors. In 1898, The Overland Monthly ran a poem making fun of Harte himself, who had moved to Europe in 1871 and never returned, for forgetting what life was like in the west.

== Influence ==
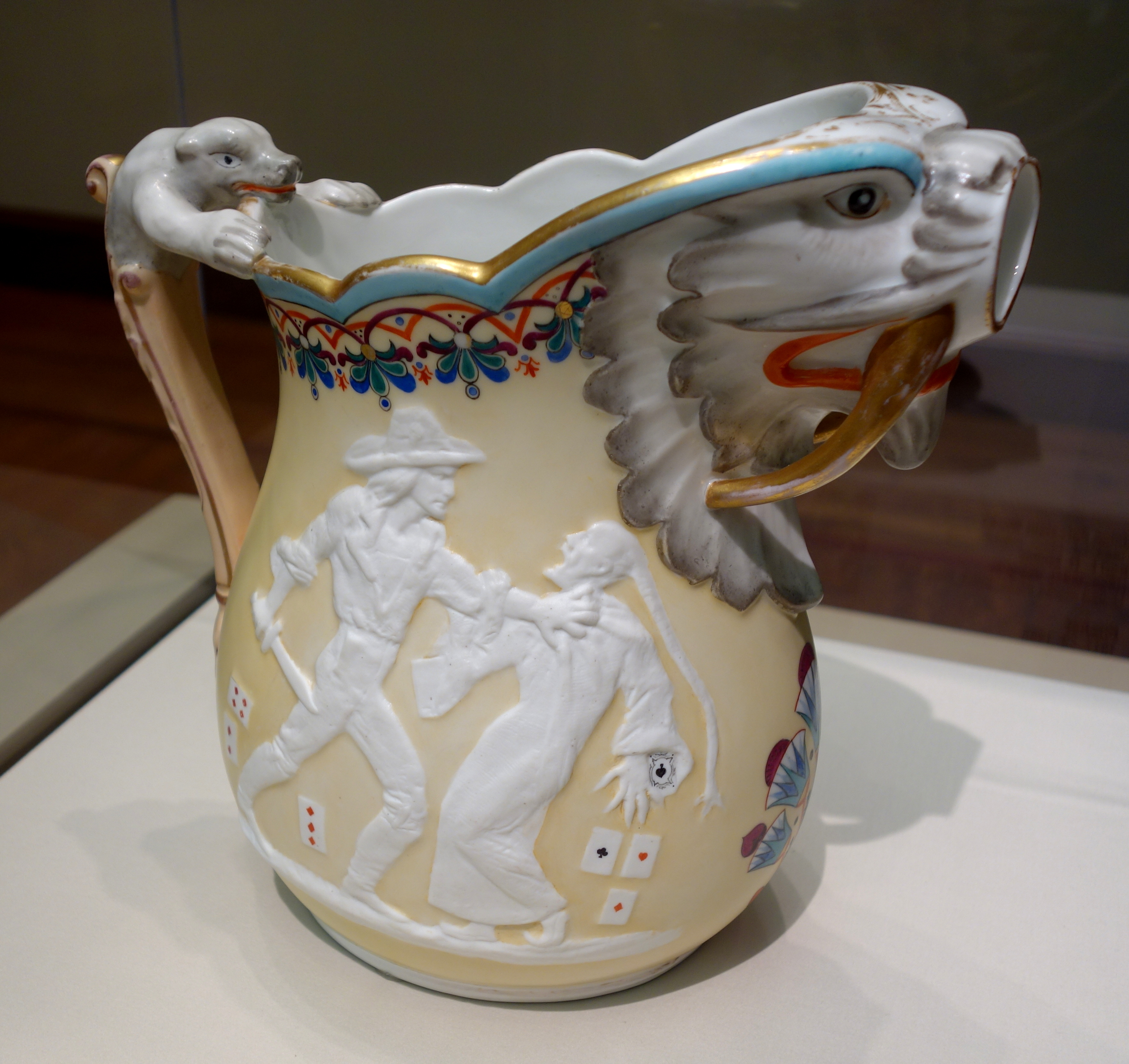
"Heathen Chinee" pitcher

"The Heathen Chinee", as the poem was most often called, was recited in public among opponents to Chinese immigration, and Eugene Casserly, a Senator from California who was "vehemently opposed to the admission of Chinese labour", apparently thanked Harte in writing for supporting his cause. The confusion was furthered by the altered title, which allowed for a more literal reading, and the illustrations in later republications. Harte's poem shaped the popular American conception of the Chinese more than any other writing at the time, and made him the most popular literary figure in America in 1870. The poem was especially relevant to Harte's fame as his other most popular works, "The Luck of Roaring Camp" and "The Outcasts of Poker Flat", were originally published without the author's name.

It inspired a series of west coast songwriters, for example, to produce songs which looked at Chinese immigrants through negative stereotypes and questioned their place in America. Some used Harte's poem word-for-word. In November 1875, Union Porcelain Works in Long Island announced the release of a pitcher decorated with figures from "The Heathen Chinee". The title character was depicted with four aces falling from his sleeve.

The influence continued for decades and spread into other authors' writings. In 1895, for example, Adeline Knapp published her short story "The Ways That Are Dark", quoting a line from the poem. In 1931, Earl Derr Biggers considered the same quote from the poem as a title for his sixth Charlie Chan novel, inspired by a movie studio executive's suggestion, "Incidentally, could you use the Bret Harte—heathen Chinee phrase of 'Ways that are dark' as a possible title for some forthcoming exploits?" Ralph Townsend used the same line for his anti-Chinese book Ways That Are Dark.
