= Luck of Roaring Camp (film) =

1937 western film

- Directed by: Irvin Willat
- Written by: Harvey Gates
- Based on: The Luck of Roaring Camp by Bret Harte
- Produced by: Scott R. Dunlap
- Starring: Owen Davis; Charles Brokaw; Joan Woodbury
- Cinematography: Paul Ivano
- Edited by: Michael Luciano
- Music by: Mischa Bakaleinikoff
- Production company: Monogram Pictures
- Distributed by: Monogram Pictures
- Release date: November 17, 1937
- Running time: 58 minutes
- Country: United States
- Language: English

Luck of Roaring Camp is a 1937 American western film directed by Irvin Willat and starring Owen Davis, Charles Brokaw and Joan Woodbury. It is based on the 1868 story The Luck of Roaring Camp by Bret Harte. It was shot at the Iverson Ranch in California.

== Cast ==
- Owen Davis Jr. as Davy
- Charles Brokaw as Don Oakhurst
- Joan Woodbury as Elsie
- Sheila Bromley as Susan Oakhurst
- Ferris Taylor as Judge Brandt
- Bob Kortman as Yuba Bill
- Charles King as Sandy
- Byron Foulger as Kentuck
- Robert McKenzie as Tuttle

== Bibliography ==
- Pitts, Michael R. Western Movies: A Guide to 5,105 Feature Films. McFarland, 2012.
