= 35th Indiana Infantry Regiment =

35th Regiment Indiana Infantry
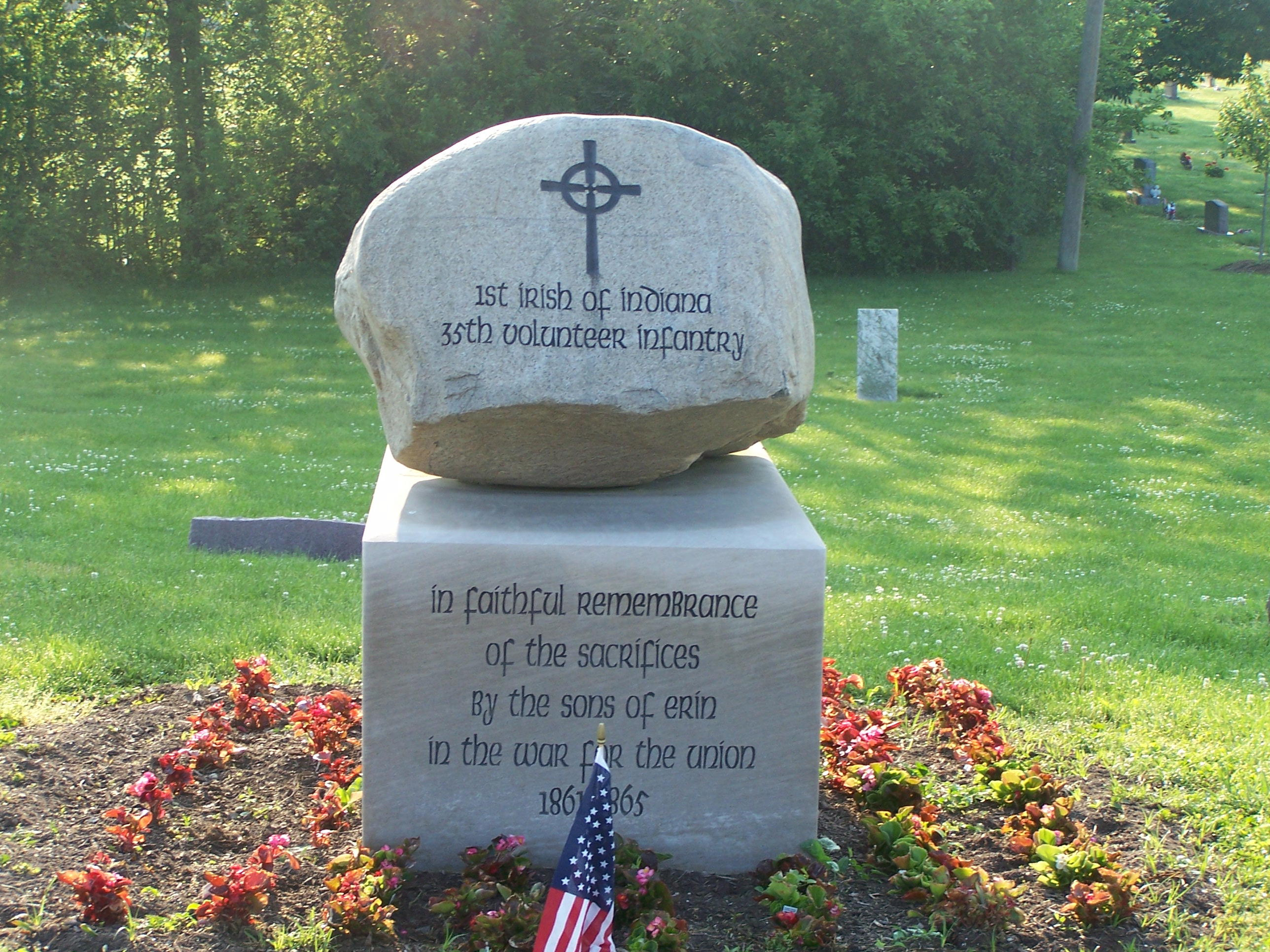
- Monument commemorating the 35th Indiana
- Active: 1861 - 1865
- Country: United States of America
- Allegiance: Union
- Branch: Union Army
- Type: Regiment
- Role: Infantry
- Part of: Army of the Ohio, 1862; Army of the Cumberland, 1863-1865 XIV Army Corps, XXI Army Corps, IV Army Corps
- Nickname: 1st Irish Regiment
- Mottos: Be just and fear not. (Vaness, Indianapolis Journal December 1861)
- Colors: Emerald green (with scarlet and gold letters), large eagle with shamrock and harp suspended on a green ribbon from its beak (Vaness, Indianapolis Journal December 1861)
- Anniversaries: December 11, 1861 (mustering in); October 23, 1865 (discharge)
- Engagements: Battle of Stones River; Tullahoma Campaign; Battle of Hoover's Gap; Battle of Chickamauga; First Battle of Chattanooga; Third Battle of Chattanooga; Battle of Ringgold Gap; Atlanta campaign Battle of Rocky Face Ridge; Battle of Resaca; Battle of New Hope Church; Battle of Dallas; Battle of Marietta; Battle of Kennesaw Mountain; Battle of Atlanta; Battle of Jonesboro; Franklin-Nashville Campaign; Battle of Columbia; Battle of Franklin; Battle of Nashville

Commanders
- Chaplain: Father Peter Paul Cooney
- Notable commanders: Colonel John C. Walker; Colonel Bernard F. Mullen; Colonel Augustus Gabriel de Vivier Tassin; Major John P. Dufficy

The 35th Indiana Infantry Regiment, also known as 1st Irish Regiment as it was mainly made up of Irish-Americans, was a unit of the Union Army during the American Civil War.

== Service ==
- Organized December 11, 1861
- Battle of Stones River
- Battle of Hoover's Gap
- Battle of Chickamauga
- First Battle of Chattanooga
- Third Battle of Chattanooga
- Ringgold Gap
- Atlanta campaign
- Battle of Rocky Face Ridge
- Battle of Resaca
- Battle of New Hope Church
- Battle of Dallas
- Battle of Marietta
- Battle of Kennesaw Mountain
- Atlanta
- Battle of Jonesborough
- Franklin-Nashville Campaign
- Battle of Columbia
- Battle of Franklin
- Battle of Nashville
- Mustered out on October 23, 1865

== Commanders ==
- Colonel John C. Walker
- Colonel Bernard F. Mullen
- Colonel August Tassin
- Major John P. Dufficy

== See also ==
- Irish Americans in the American Civil War
- List of Indiana Civil War regiments
- Indiana in the Civil War
