= John C. Walker =

American politician

John C. Walker was an American physician and prominent Democrat political figure in Indianapolis, Indiana during the American Civil War. In 1861, he was commissioned colonel in command of the 35th Indiana Infantry Regiment ("First Irish"). Disagreements with his superiors, including Governor Morton, led to his removal from command and the issuance of an order for his arrest. He was returned to Indiana on an excuse of medical infirmity. He later participated in Copperhead activity in Indiana, the discovery of which forced him to flee to the United Kingdom for the duration of the war. He returned after hostilities had ceased and resumed practice as a physician.
