= Four of the Apocalypse =

1975 film directed by Lucio Fulci

- Italian theatrical release poster
- Directed by: Lucio Fulci
- Screenplay by: Ennio De Concini
- Story by: Ennio De Concini
- Based on: "The Luck of Roaring Camp" "The Outcasts of Poker Flat" by Bret Harte
- Produced by: Edmondo Amati
- Starring: Fabio Testi; Lynne Frederick; Michael J. Pollard; Harry Baird; Adolfo Lastretti; Tomas Milian
- Cinematography: Sergio Salvati
- Edited by: Ornella Micheli
- Music by: Franco Bixio; Fabio Frizzi; Vince Tempera
- Production company: Coralta Cinematografica
- Distributed by: Cineriz
- Release date: 12 August 1975 (Italy)
- Running time: 105 minutes
- Country: Italy
- Languages: Italian; English

Four of the Apocalypse (Italian: I quattro dell'apocalisse) is a 1975 Italian spaghetti Western film directed by Lucio Fulci and starring Fabio Testi, Tomas Milian, Lynne Frederick and Michael J. Pollard.

== Plot ==
Set in the year 1873, professional gambler Stubby Preston arrives in the Wild West town of Salt Flats, Utah with plans to work the local casino but is arrested by the sheriff the moment he steps off the stagecoach. What Stubby doesn't know is that a group of locals have planned a vigilante attack on the casino that night, which the sheriff plans to turn a blind eye to. The only criminals to survive are those who were in the jail when it happened: Stubby, a pregnant prostitute named Bunny, a disturbed, but gentle black man named Bud, and an alcoholic named Clem.

In the morning the sheriff sees the four safely out of the town and gives them a wagon and horses in exchange for Stubby's $1,000 stake. The four set out together, and Stubby suggests they head for Sun City, 200 miles (322 km) South. Along the way, they meet up with a group of Quaker immigrants, whose patriarch mistakes the pregnant Bunny as Stubby's wife. Stubby and Bunny play along, then continue the ruse during the rest of their journey. The Quakers go their own way, and shortly after, the four witness a violent bandit raid on some unfortunate settlers.

Bunny's birthday happens, and the four stop by a river. Bud catches a fish, a cake is fashioned from the sand, and Stubby offers up some canteened water as a toast. The toast is interrupted by gunshots, and the spit cooking the fish is neatly destroyed. Demonstrating his accuracy with a gun, a wanderer named Chaco invites himself to their group. Stubby is immediately suspicious, but for a while things go well. Three gunmen approach and Chaco saves the group from them, but the gunmen turn out to be lawmen and Chaco tortures the surviving deputy. Despite this, the group accepts the peyote buttons Chaco gives them one night by the campfire. Stubby chews some, but spits out most, retaining his senses when Chaco uses the promise of whiskey to persuade Clem to tie them up... starting with Stubby. Stubby resists, but is thwarted by Chaco, who binds Stubby and Bud together, and Bunny to a tree. Chaco rapes Bunny, taunts Stubby, then tells Clem to "be quick about it" if he wants to rape Bunny also and go with Chaco. Clem realizes what he did and tries to stop Chaco, who shoots Clem in the leg and leaves them all for dead. Clem manages to free Stubby, who frees the others. Bud builds a stretcher for Clem, while Stubby removes the bullet from Clem's leg. The four set out again.

Chaco and his cohorts pick up and follow their trail. Chaco is about to discover them when his friends call out that they spotted a caravan of 'bible-folk' they can get supplies from, and the bandits set of after them. Stubby and the others later come across the remains of the caravan and the immigrants they met earlier. Chaco killed them all, and Stubby vows a second time to kill Chaco.

Caught in a rainstorm, the four take shelter in a ghost town. Clem later dies from infection. This sends the already fragile minded Bud into a mad and confused state, as he carries Clem's body away. Stubby and Bunny admit love to each other and have sex. Later Bud returns with meat he managed to find which they all cook and eat. Bud shows the extent of his madness by insisting that the residents of the ghost town have been coming out to meet him every night. When Stubby discovers the meat came from the corpse of Clem, Stubby and Bunny decide to leave Bud to his friends the ghosts as there is nothing they can do for him.

On the road, the two run into an old pastor friend of Stubby's shortly before Bunny goes into pained labor. Rushing to a snowy, mountaintop mining town populated entirely by men, the local chauvinistic townsmen are disturbed that a woman is giving birth in their home, but as they discuss it become fascinated and excited that their town would give new life instead of just taking it. Bunny dies in childbirth, which leaves Stubby in shock. The townsmen, now enraptured with the child, gather round and take care him and insist that the pastor perform a baptism. Needing a name, the most enthusiastic townsman names the child Lucky. This awakens Stubby from his shock and he gratefully grants guardianship of Lucky to the townsmen.

Now alone, Stubby heads out and to seek revenge on Chaco. He spots the wagon the sheriff of Salt Flats had 'sold' him, and finds his shaving gear still in it. Chaco and his two friends are holding up in a barn. Stubby quickly kills two of the bandits and taunts and tortures a wounded Chaco, who taunts back by holding up the dead evangelist's cross and reminding him of Bunny's rape. Stubby shoots Chaco dead without another word, and heads off into the horizon after welcoming a stray dog to join him.

== Cast ==
- Fabio Testi as Stubby Preston
- Lynne Frederick as Emanuelle "Bunny" O'Neill
- Michael J. Pollard as Clem
- Harry Baird as Bud Wilson
- Tomas Milian as Chaco
- Donal O'Brien as Sheriff of Salt Flat
- Adolfo Lastretti as Reverend Sullivan
- Bruno Corazzari as Lemmy

== Production ==
Four of the Apocalypse was the first collaboration between director Lucio Fulci and cinematographer Sergio Salvati. The film was one of Salvati's first assignments as a director of photography. Salvati would work again with Fulci on several films ranging from Dracula in the Provinces, Zombi 2 and The House by the Cemetery.

== Release ==
Four of the Apocalypse was released on 12 August 1975 in Italy. The film did not meet expectations, financially, on its release.

== Reception ==
From retrospective reviews, AllMovie stated that the film "could very well be the Italian splatter-master's most personal, poignant, and compelling film – not to mention one of the most original spaghetti Westerns ever filmed." In his biography on Fulci, Troy Howarth described Four of the Apocalypse as "without a doubt one of Fulci's finest films," one that "fulfills signs of poetry and lyricism hinted at in earlier works" with "consistently gorgeous" imagery.
