= The Californian (1880s magazine) =

The Californian was a San Francisco literary periodical issued monthly during 1880–1882, published by Anton Roman, who had helped found the earlier (and later) Overland Monthly. The Californian was a continuation of the Overland Monthly after its 1875 cessation, and changed back into the Overland Monthly in late 1882.

== History ==
The Californian was first edited by Frederick M. Somers as a purely Western-focused magazine. Some have called it "Somers' Californian" to distinguish it from an earlier 1860s newspaper, The Californian, and from the later Californian Illustrated Magazine funded by Charles Frederick Holder and edited by Edmund Clarence Stedman. The first editorial statement, in the first issue, was

The Californian will be thoroughly Western in character, local to this coast in its flavor, representative and vigorous in its style and method of dealing with questions, and edited for popular rather than for a severely literary constituency.

Contributors included Joaquin Miller, Edward Rowland Sill, Ambrose Bierce, John Muir, Josiah Royce, Joseph LeConte, Charles Edwin Markham, Yda Hillis Addis, Katharine Lee Bates, Kate Douglas Wiggin and Ina Coolbrith.

A half year after publication began, the reaction in other periodicals was good. In California, the San Francisco Bulletin said the new magazine was "a serial which more and more proves its claim to be no unworthy successor of The Overland..." The Oakland Tribune wrote that "[i]t is a capital magazine, creditable to its editor and contributors, and a proud monument to the originality and culture of the Pacific Coast." Praise for the magazine spread eastward, too. The Daily Hawkeye in Burlington, Iowa noted that "the articles it contains are fully equal to those in the Eastern periodicals. It is a credit to the Pacific Coast". In Philadelphia, the Chronicle-Herald noticed that "many of the contributors are women, some of whom write with much grace and force. There is the odor of the Pacific about the whole publication, which deserves to win its way into many Eastern homes."

Lawyer and poet Charles Henry Phelps followed Somers as editor. Phelps edited the periodical until it folded in September 1882. The editors and contributors published The Californian and Overland Monthly for three months beginning in October 1882, then in January, 1883 dropped the word "Californian" entirely to revive the old Overland Monthly.
