= The Outcasts of Poker Flat (1937 film) =

1937 film by Christy Cabanne

- Theatrical release poster
- Directed by: Christy Cabanne
- Screenplay by: John Twist; Harry Segall
- Based on: The Outcasts of Poker Flat; 1868 story in The Overland Monthly by Bret Harte
- Produced by: Robert Sisk
- Starring: Preston Foster; Jean Muir; Van Heflin; Virginia Weidler; Margaret Irving
- Cinematography: Robert De Grasse
- Edited by: Ted Cheesman
- Music by: Roy Webb
- Production company: RKO Pictures
- Distributed by: RKO Pictures
- Release date: April 16, 1937
- Running time: 67 minutes
- Country: United States
- Language: English

The Outcasts of Poker Flat is a 1937 American Western film directed by Christy Cabanne and written by John Twist and Harry Segall. The film stars Preston Foster, Jean Muir, Van Heflin, Virginia Weidler and Margaret Irving. The film was released on April 16, 1937, by RKO Pictures.

The screenplay is based on the short story The Outcasts of Poker Flat by Bret Harte, which has been brought to film at least five times, including in 1919 The Outcasts of Poker Flat with Harry Carey and in 1952 The Outcasts of Poker Flat with Dale Robertson.

== Plot ==
A gunfighter and gambler, John Oakhurst ends up caring for a baby girl whose mother dies in childbirth. He decides to call her "Luck" and looks to new schoolmarm Helen Colby and the Rev. Sam Woods to set a good example for the girl.

Luck grows up and Poker Flat grows into a boom town. One day, while John and the reverend are quarreling about the bad element that John and his partner, The Duchess, permit in their gambling house, Luck ends up playing cards with Sonoma, a vicious outlaw. A furious John explodes at Helen, feeling she was supposed to be keeping an eye on Luck at the time. Helen decides to leave town, but Luck convinces her that John loves her.

Determined to change into a better man, John refuses to be goaded into a showdown by Sonoma, at least until The Duchess taunts him, whereupon he kills Sonoma and another man. A vigilante group orders John and The Duchess out of town and Helen goes along. Their horses are stolen and, in the mountains in winter, The Duchess freezes to death. Helen nearly dies, but just as Luck rides up to rescue her, they find that John, feeling guilty for what he's done, has taken his own life.

== Cast ==
- Preston Foster as John Oakhurst
- Jean Muir as Miss Helen Colby
- Van Heflin as Reverend Sam Woods
- Virginia Weidler as Luck
- Margaret Irving as The Duchess
- Frank M. Thomas as Mr. Bedford
- Si Jenks as Kentuck
- Dick Elliott as Stumpy Carter
- Al St. John as Uncle Billy
- Bradley Page as Sonoma
- Richard Lane as High-Grade
- Monte Blue as Indian Jim
- Billy Gilbert as Charley
- Dudley Clements as Wilkes
