= The Outcasts of Poker Flat (1952 film) =

1952 film by Joseph M. Newman

- Theatrical release poster
- Directed by: Joseph M. Newman
- Screenplay by: Edmund H. North
- Based on: The Outcasts of Poker Flat; 1868 story in The Overland Monthly by Bret Harte
- Produced by: Julian Blaustein
- Starring: Anne Baxter; Dale Robertson
- Cinematography: Joseph LaShelle
- Edited by: William Reynolds
- Music by: Hugo Friedhofer
- Color process: Black and white
- Production company: 20th Century Fox
- Distributed by: 20th Century Fox
- Release date: May 16, 1952
- Running time: 81 minutes
- Country: United States
- Language: English

The Outcasts of Poker Flat is a 1952 American Western film directed by Joseph M. Newman and starring Anne Baxter and Dale Robertson. The screenplay is based on a short story of the same name by Bret Harte. Harte's story has been brought to film at least five times, including in 1919 with Harry Carey and in 1937 with Preston Foster.

== Plot ==
Ryker, a murderous western outlaw, leaves death and destruction behind after a robbery in Poker Flat and leaves the loot with his wife, Cal, before riding off. A while later, the shaken town decides to banish all undesirables. They include gambler John Oakhurst, saloonkeeper and madam The Duchess, and the town drunk, Jake, as well as Cal, who had been spotted with Ryker, even though no one knows they are husband and wife.

The others follow Oakhurst, not knowing what else to do. On a mountain trail they come across young Tom Dakin and his pregnant sweetheart Piney, who are headed for Poker Flat to be wed. In a snowstorm, Oakhurst leads them to a remote cabin. Their horses stampede, so Tom takes off for Poker Flat on foot to get help, given $500 of the stolen money by Cal in case he needs to pay someone to form a rescue party.

Ryker turns up, also on foot. He is shocked to find Cal, becomes suspicious and beats her, as well as bullying the others and eating all of their remaining food. He shoots Jake just for taking a bottle of whiskey. Cal develops a bond with Oakhurst and eventually reveals her situation to him. A fight begins after Ryker shoots and kills The Duchess in cold blood, and Oakhurst is able to strangle him to death. Tom arrives with the rescue party, and while he and Piney head back toward Poker Flat, Oakhurst and Cal go the other way together.

== Cast ==
- Anne Baxter as Cal
- Dale Robertson as John Oakhurst
- Miriam Hopkins as Mrs. Shipton aka 'The Duchess'
- Cameron Mitchell as Ryker
- Craig Hill as Tom Dakin
- Barbara Bates as Piney Wilson
- William H. Lynn as Jake Watterson
- Dick Rich as Drunk
