= Anton Roman =

California publisher & bookseller (1828–1903)

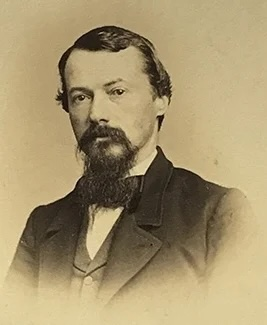
- In the late 1870s
- Born: 1828; Bavaria, Germany
- Died: 1903 (aged 74–75); San Francisco, California, U.S.
- Occupations: Bookseller, publisher
- Known for: Publishing Gold Rush-era California literature
- Spouse: Eliza Fletcher Roman
- Children: 2

Anton Roman (1828–1903) was a miner, bookseller, and publisher in California during the second half of the nineteenth century. Over a career spanning more than four decades, he founded the literary magazine Overland Monthly and established one of the earliest successful bookselling enterprises in the American West.

Through his publishing imprint, Roman issued more than one hundred works by California writers and developed early California literary figures such as Ina Coolbrith, Charles Warren Stoddard, and Bret Harte. Anton Roman was instrumental in romanticizing and mythologizing California.

== Arrival in California ==
Roman was born in 1828 in Bavaria, in southeastern Germany. Little is documented about his early life, though he appears to have been well educated before immigrating to the United States. He arrived in California in the early 1850s during the Gold Rush, likely following the Lassen Emigrant Trail, an overland route that brought thousands of prospectors to Northern California.

Roman mined in Trinity and Shasta Counties before moving to Yreka, north of Mount Shasta, near the gold-rich Scott Bar region. While staying in mining camps, Roman recognized a shortage of reading materials among miners. He reportedly entertained fellow campers by reading aloud from the books he carried with him.

In 1851, Roman took his earnings from mining and traveled to Portsmouth Square in San Francisco, where he visited the bookstore of John Hamilton Still. There, he reportedly exchanged one hundred ounces of gold dust for a selection of books. Roman then worked as an itinerant bookseller, distributing reading materials directly to miners in boomtowns such as Weaverville, Yreka, and Shasta City. He soon found this venture more profitable than mining itself.

== Early career ==
In 1852, Roman formally entered bookselling by renting a storefront in the bustling town of Shasta City. At the height of the Gold Rush, Shasta was known as the “Queen City of the Northern Mines” because it served as an important base of operations for miners in the Trinity Diggins Region. His shop opened during a period of economic expansion in which miners and entrepreneurs hoping to profit off the mining population—such as hotel, saloon, and stagecoach operators—flooded the region.

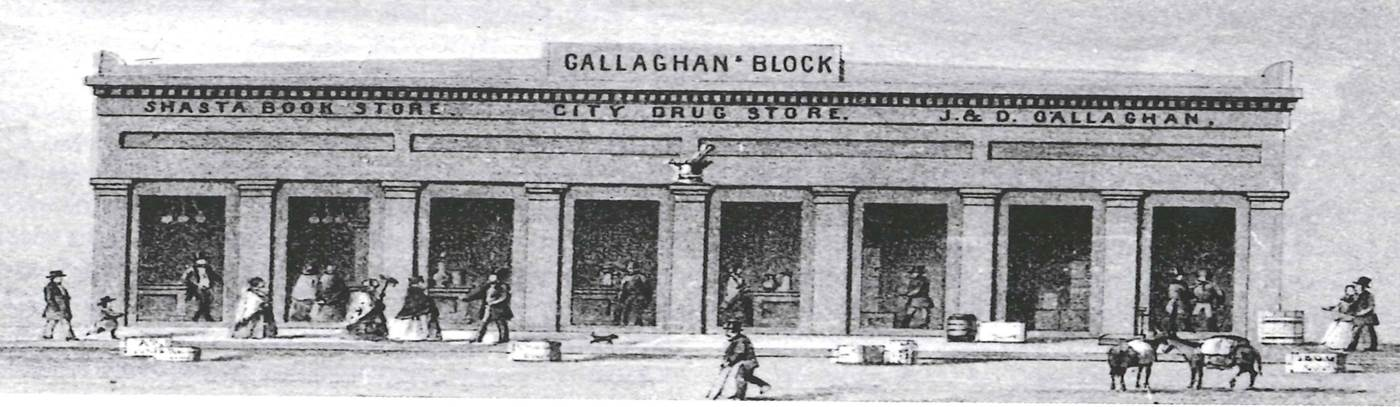
A postcard of Shasta Book Store circa 1855.

Roman stocked his inventory with “blank books, stationery, school books, miscellaneous works, gift books, novels, and playing cards.” He prospered in business for five years. In 1854, an advertisement in the Shasta Courier reported that Roman “received the largest assortment of books that was ever brought to Shasta.” By 1855, he had opened a second store in Yreka, which was operated by his brother F. Roman.

That same year, Roman began experimenting not only with selling books but also with producing them. The first item published under his imprint, “A. Roman” was a lithographed letter sheet showing scenes of mining camps. In 1856, he collaborated with San Francisco lithographers Charles C. Kuchel and Emil Dresel to publish birds-eye lithographs of the mining towns in California.

By 1857, placer mining had exhausted surface-level gold deposits in Northern California and the region's economy was slowing. Sensing this downturn, Roman closed his store in Shasta and moved south to San Francisco. Between the fall of 1857 and 1860, he was intermittently involved in the city's book trade, selling books at auction and traveling to Eastern cities to acquire inventory.

== Ascension in San Francisco ==
In San Francisco, Roman established himself as a major bookseller and publisher. He gained a reputation as a "pioneer and liberal bookseller."

In 1860, Roman opened his first store at 158 Montgomery Street. Within his first year, Roman quickly expanded his publishing output and issued approximately eight titles. His first two publications under this imprint were Austin Phelps’s A Still Hour and All Aboard; or, Life on the Lake by William Taylor Adams, believed to be one of the earliest works of children's literature published in California. In 1861, he issued The Housekeeper’s Encyclopedia, a cookbook that is considered among the earliest of its kind published in the state.

Roman's business grew steadily and in late 1861 he moved to larger premises on Montgomery Street. Over the next decade, this would be the center of his business activity and an important hub of San Francisco's literary scene.

In 1863, Roman published his first original work entitled The Resources of California by John Shertzer Hittell. Demonstrating Roman's deep belief in the potential of California, this book was an essential guide for prospective immigrants to California and was rich in detail about the geography of the state. Hittell wrote in the preface:

“I undertake to write the resources of a state, which, though young in years, small in population, and remote from the chief centres of civilization, is yet known to the furthest corners of the earth, and, during the last twelve years, has had an influence upon the course of human life, and the prosperity and trade of nations, more powerful than that exerted during the same period by kingdoms whose subjects are numbered by millions.”

Between 1864 and 1865, Roman published ten books, including two books of poetry and one play. Because Roman exhibited a willingness to publish poetry and plays, he became known among the young literati of San Francisco including figures such as Ina Coolbrith, Bret Harte, and Charles Warren Stoddard.

With his central position in San Francisco's literary scene, Roman compiled and published the first collection of California poetry entitled Outcroppings: Being Selections of California Verse. This anthology included the work of nineteen poets, including five poems by women and one Native American writer. It was the first book appearance of Ina Coolbrith and Charles Stoddard, as well as Bret Harte's first editorial project.

== Overland Monthly ==
Roman came to know several writers in California and became confident that there was material for a Western magazine. The first issue of the Overland Monthly was published in July 1868, edited by Bret Harte in San Francisco, and continued until late 1875.

The magazine was conceived as a Western counterpart to Eastern literary journals such as The Atlantic Monthly, with the goal of representing the intellectual and cultural life of California. The magazine published fiction, poetry, essays, and reportage rooted in Western life.

Roman's decision to start the Overland Monthly reflects his devotion to both the literary and commercial development of California. He later recalled that he intended the magazine to “help the material development of the coast,” and expressed concern that Harte “leaned too much into the literary articles.” Describing his inspiration for the magazine, Roman wrote:

“Here I saw an opportunity for a magazine that would furnish information for the development of our new State and all this great territory, to make itself of such value that it could not fail to impress not only the people of the West Coast, but the East as well."

In addition to fiction and poetry by Bret Harte and Charles Warren Stoddard, the magazine featured contributions from Mark Twain, who served as a European correspondent, and from Henry George, who contributed essays on railroads and their implications for California. The magazine also published work by female writers.

The Overland Monthly proved to be both a critical and financial success. Roman later wrote that Harte's mining stories “carried the public by storm.” However, by the end of its first year in 1869, Roman became ill and temporarily withdrew from active business. He subsequently sold his interest in the magazine to John Carmany for $7,500.

== Publishing interests ==
Roman's diverse publications reflected a changing California, including the development of a legal system and Chinese immigration during the Gold Rush, as well as the early formation of its literary life.

=== Miners and prospective settlers ===
In 1867, Roman reprinted Gregory Yale's Legal titles to mining claims and water rights in California, under the mining law of Congress. This text offered a foundational legal analysis of mining claims and water rights in California immediately following the first federal mining law of July 1866 (often known as the "Chaffee law"). He also published the mining manual Nevada and California Processes of Silver and Gold Extraction, which outlined different methods for extracting precious metals.

=== Chinese and Russian texts ===
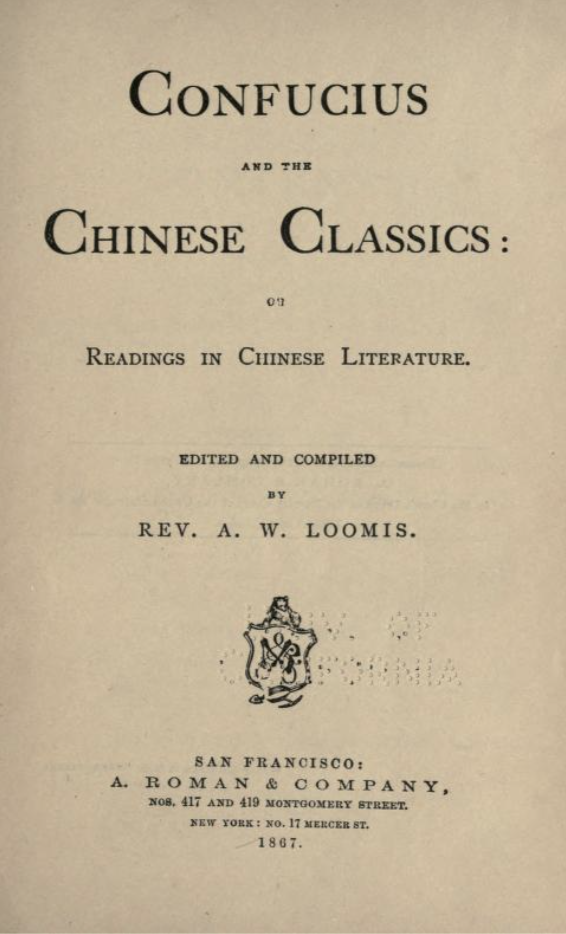
Anton Roman's edition of Confucious, 1867

With the completion of the first transcontinental railroad and the expansion of trade with China and Japan, Roman grew his bookstore to include works on East Asia. His imprint appeared on A. W. Loomis's Confucius and the Chinese Classics and an English-Chinese phrasebook.

Writing in the preface, Roman explained that the text's purpose was “to enable all classes of citizens, especially merchants, shipmasters, contractors, families, and travelers to acquire an elementary and practical knowledge of the spoken language of the Canton dialect.” Similarly, Roman printed in 1868 a collection of Russian and English phrases.

Roman published T.A. Kendo's Treatise on Silk and Tea Culture, motivated by the “attention being paid to the cultivation, in this State, of many trees, shrubs and other vegetable productions heretofore only grown extensively in Japan and the Orient.” It offered practical guidance on cultivating mulberry and persimmon trees in California.

=== Schoolbooks ===
Roman also published children's books and school texts. In the 1860s, his imprint issued the Inglenook and Golden Gate series. These children's stories were set in California and designed to be familiar to local readers; the company advertised that young Californians would “recognize many familiar places and personages.” Roman also printed textbooks such as Augustus Layres’ Elements of Composition and Carrie Carlton’s Popular Letter Writer in editions "particularly adapted to the wants of California."

== Later life ==
Through the 1870s, Anton Roman continued to advertise his bookstore as the largest in California. One 1871 advertisement proclaimed, “Here we are, geographically isolated from the throng, and yet the greatest cities cannot show a more complete establishment than ours.”

Roman closed his New York office and store in 1879 and later reestablished his business on a smaller scale at 511 California Street in San Francisco, having suffered significant financial setbacks during the decade. In 1880, he returned to magazine publishing with The Californian: A Western Monthly Magazine, which featured works from Ambrose Bierce and Joaquin Miller. In 1883, the successors of the initial Overland Monthly came to Roman and asked to merge magazines with The Californian. The project of the merger, the new Overland Monthly, would continue until 1935.

Published in 1886, his final work was Memories of an Old Actor by Walter Leman. 1887 was the last year of Roman's business.

On June 21, 1903, Roman was traveling with his son and daughter on the North Pacific Coast Railroad when a railcar derailed near Tomales, California. He was among those injured in the accident and later died from his injuries at the age of seventy-five.

== Selected Publications ==
=== Science, travel, and reference works ===
- Hittell, John S. (1863). The Resources of California: Comprising Agriculture, Mining, Geography, Climate, Commerce, &c., and the Past and Future Development of the State.
- Cronise, Titus Fey (1870). The Agricultural and Other Resources of California: Comprising Twenty Years of Progress.
- Yale, Gregory (1867). Legal Titles to Mining Claims and Water Rights in California, Under the Mining Law of Congress, of July 1866.
- A Sketch of the Route to California, China, and Japan, via the Isthmus of Panama: A Useful and Amusing Book to Every Traveler (1867).
- The Law of Storms: The Various Phenomena by Which Their Approach Can Be Ascertained with Certainty, and Practical Directions to Mariners for the Avoidance of Their Fury (1869).
- Leman, Walter M. (1886). Memories of an Old Actor.
- Bolander, Henry N. A Catalogue of the Plants Growing in the Vicinity of San Francisco.
- Poston, Charles D. The Sun Worshipers of Asia.
- Honcharenko, Agapius. Russian and English Phrase Book, Specially Adapted for the Use of Traders, Travelers, and Teachers.

=== Periodicals ===
- California Medical Gazette: A Monthly Journal of Medical and Surgical Science (1869–1870)
- The Californian (1880–1882)
- Overland Monthly (1868–1935)

=== Literature and poetry ===
- Stoddard, Charles Warren. Poems.
- Meyer, George Homer. Lamara and Other Poems.
- Meilhac, Henri and Halévy, Ludovic (adapt.). Regolstein: A Comedy (adaptation of La Grande-Duchesse de Gérolstein).
- In Bonds: A Novel (pseud. Laura Preston) (1867).

=== Juvenile series ===
- Golden Gate Series (1870)
- Inglenook Series (1870)
- Stories from Gold Lands (1868)
- Boat Club Series (1862), by Oliver Optic (William T. Adams)
