= Augustus Gabriel de Vivier Tassin =

American Civil War Union soldier (1842–1893)

Augustus Gabriel de Vivier Tassin (1842–1893) was a French-born American soldier who served in the Union Army during the American Civil War. After the war he occupied a variety of posts in the American West. He made notable contributions in writing descriptive accounts of several Native American groups.

== Life and career ==
Tassin was born in Paris on October 12, 1842, but immigrated to the United States at New Orleans, Louisiana, on October 25, 1852. When the Civil War broke out, he was living in Leopold, Indiana. He enlisted as a first lieutenant in the 35th Indiana Infantry Regiment on September 15, 1861. During the war he rose to the rank of full colonel, with distinguished service in the Battle of Missionary Ridge in Tennessee and the campaigns for Atlanta and Nashville. In December 1870, he voluntarily left the American army in order to serve with the French military during the Franco-Prussian War. When he returned, Tassin reenlisted, rising from the rank of private to second lieutenant, first lieutenant, and captain. He was assigned to various military posts in California, Arizona Territory, and the Dakotas, as well as in New York, Virginia, and Washington, D.C. He was the Indian agent at the Colorado River Indian Agency in Parker, Arizona, when he died on October 19, 1893.

Augustus Gabrial de Vivier Tassin is buried in Arlington National Cemetery along with his wife Mary Tilley Tassin (deceased December 2, 1920) and a son Wirt de Vivier Tassin (deceased November 02, 1915). Augustus and Mary also had a daughter Ethyl and another son, Alger(n)on (sic, who taught Oral Literature Columbia University from 1905 to 1941.

== Writings ==
Tassin wrote descriptive and sometimes literary or whimsical accounts based on his army experiences in the American West. Most of these accounts were published as articles in the periodical Overland Monthly. They included discussions of the Koncow (Maidu) Indians of northeastern California, the Round Valley Indians of northwestern California, the Mohave on the lower Colorado River, native groups in the Pacific Northwest, and the Apache.
