= The Adventures of Mark Twain =

The Adventures of Mark Twain is the title of two films:

- The Adventures of Mark Twain (1944 film), starring Fredric March as Twain
- The Adventures of Mark Twain (1985 film), a stop-motion animated film
