= Bret Harte =

American fiction writer and poet (1836–1902)

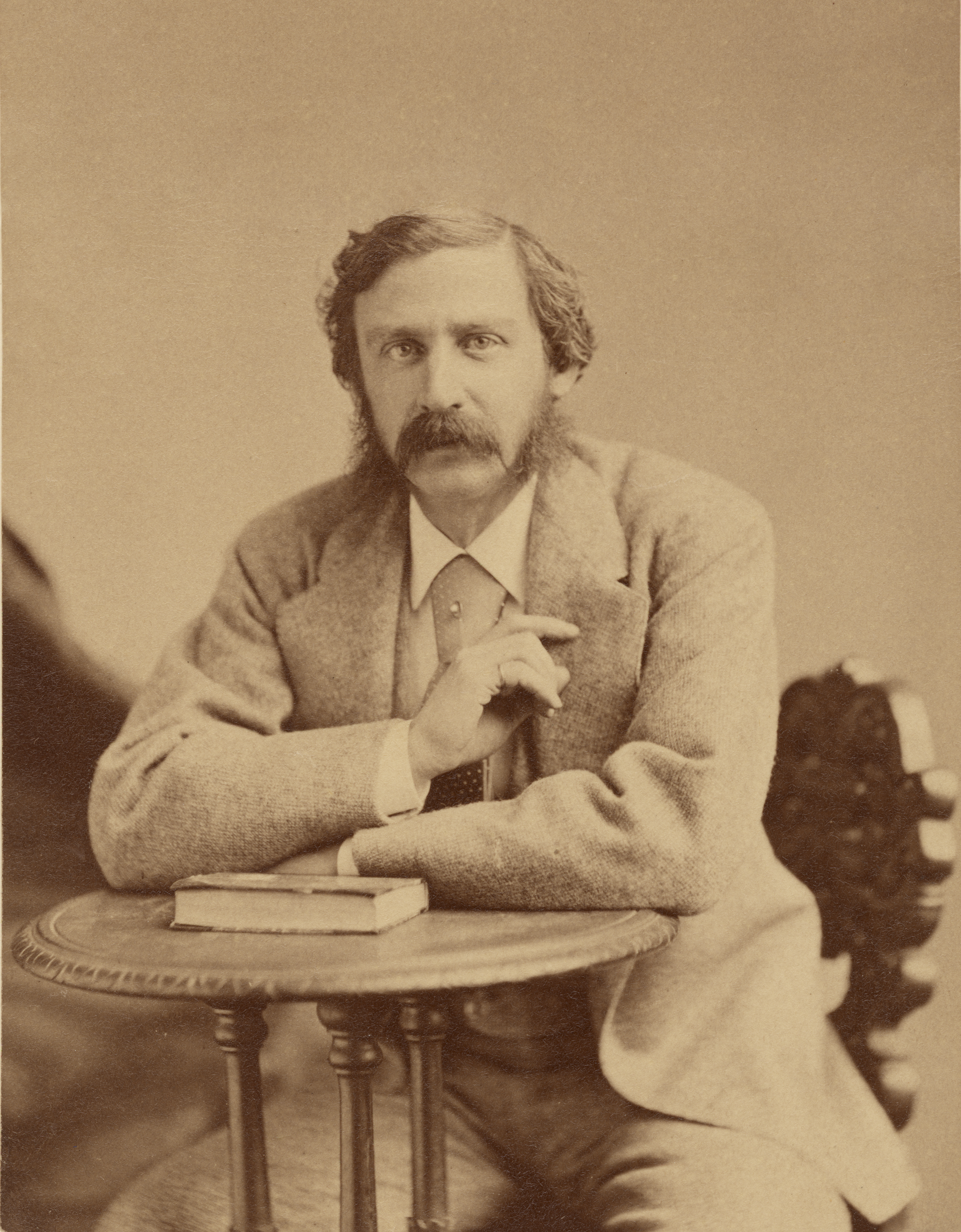
- Bret Harte in 1872
- Born: Francis Brett Hart; August 25, 1836; Albany, New York, US
- Died: May 5, 1902 (aged 65); Camberley, England
- Occupation: Author
- Spouse: Anna Griswold (m. ca. 1862–1902; his death)
- Children: 4
- Writing career
- Genres: Fiction, poetry

Francis Brett Hart (August 25, 1836 – May 5, 1902), known as Bret Harte (/hɑːrt/ HART), was an American short story writer and poet best remembered for short fiction featuring miners, gamblers, and other romantic figures of the California Gold Rush. In a career spanning more than four decades, he also wrote poetry, plays, lectures, book reviews, editorials, and magazine sketches.

Harte moved from California to the eastern U.S. and later to Europe. He incorporated new subjects and characters into his stories, but his Gold Rush tales have been those most often reprinted, adapted, and admired.

== Early life ==
Harte was born in 1836 in Albany, New York. He was named after his great-grandfather, Francis Brett. When he was young, his father, Henry, changed the spelling of the family name from Hart to Harte. Henry's father was Bernard Hart, an Orthodox Jewish immigrant who flourished as a merchant, becoming one of the founders of the New York Stock Exchange. Bret's mother, Elizabeth Rebecca Ostrander Hart, was from the English and Dutch culture and raised her child in a Dutch Reformed church. Later, Francis preferred to be known by his middle name, but he spelled it with only one "t", becoming Bret Harte. Harte was of French Huguenot and Dutch ancestry and descended from prominent New York landowner Francis Rombouts.

An avid reader as a boy, Harte published his first work at age 11, a satirical poem titled "Autumn Musings", now lost. Rather than attracting praise, the poem garnered ridicule from his family. As an adult, he recalled to a friend, "Such a shock was their ridicule to me that I wonder that I ever wrote another line of verse."

Harte's formal schooling ended when he was 13, in 1849.

== Career in California ==
Harte moved to California in 1853, later working there in a number of capacities, including miner, teacher, messenger, and journalist; he was also secretary of the San Francisco Mint. He spent part of his life in the northern California coastal town of Union (now Arcata), a settlement on Humboldt Bay, as a tutor and school teacher, then a printer's devil on The Northern Californian, and went on to reporting news, writing poems, and occasionally, acting editor. He left after three years, due to receiving lynching threats for writing an editorial about the 26 February 1860 Wiyot massacre.

Union was established as a provisioning center for mining camps in the interior.

The Wells Fargo Messenger of July 1916 relates that after an unsuccessful attempt to make a living in the gold camps, Harte signed on as a messenger with Wells Fargo & Co. Express. He guarded treasure boxes on stagecoaches for a few months, then gave it up to become the schoolmaster at a school near the town of Sonora, in the Sierra foothills. He created his character Yuba Bill from his memory of an old stagecoach driver.

The 1860 massacre by white settlers of between 80 and 200 Wiyot Indians at the village of Tuluwat (near Eureka in Humboldt County, California) was reported by Harte in San Francisco and New York. While serving as assistant editor of the Northern Californian, Harte was left in charge of the paper during the temporary absence of his boss, Stephen G. Whipple. Harte published a detailed account condemning the slayings, writing:

[A] more shocking and revolting spectacle was never exhibited to the eyes of a Christian and civilized people. Old women, wrinkled and decrepit, lay weltering in blood, their brains dashed out and dabbled with their long gray hair. Infants scarce a span long, with their faces cloven with hatchets and their bodies ghastly with wounds.

After he published the editorial, Harte's life was threatened, and he was forced to flee one month later. Harte quit his job and moved to San Francisco, where an anonymous letter published in a city paper describing widespread community approval of the massacre was attributed to him. In addition, no one was ever brought to trial, despite the evidence of a planned attack and of references to specific individuals, including a rancher named Larabee and other members of the unofficial militia called the Humboldt Volunteers.

Among Harte's first literary efforts was a poem published in The Golden Era in 1857 and, in October of that same year, his first prose piece on "A Trip Up the Coast". When he escaped to San Francisco in the spring of 1860, he was hired as editor of The Golden Era, which he attempted to make into a more literary publication. California journalist Bret Harte first wrote as "The Bohemian" in The Golden Era in 1861, with this persona taking part in many satirical doings. Harte described San Francisco as a sort of Bohemia of the West. Mark Twain later recalled that, as an editor, Harte struck "a new and fresh and spirited note" which "rose above that orchestra's mumbling confusion and was recognizable as music".

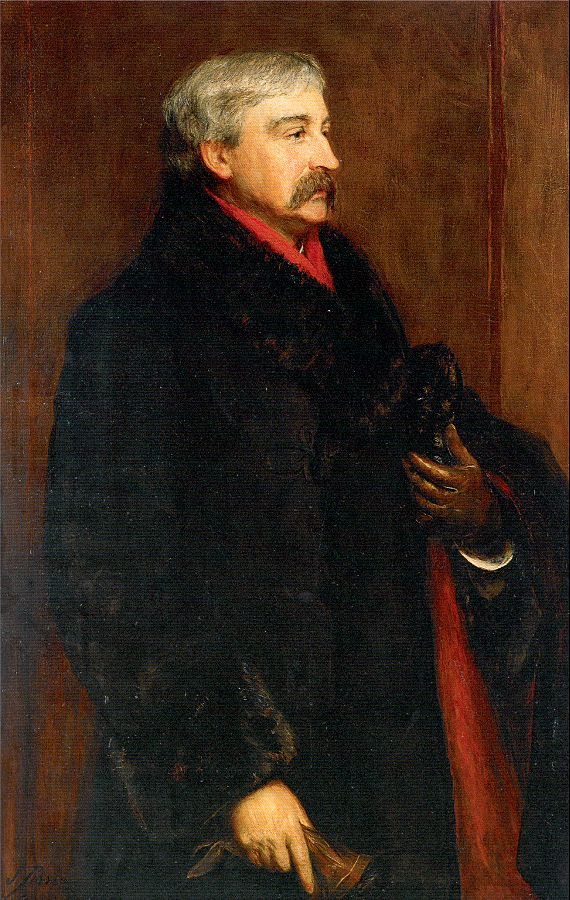
Portrait of Bret Harte – oil painting by John Pettie (1884)

Harte married Anna Griswold on August 11, 1862, in San Rafael, California. From the start, the marriage was rocky. Some suggested that she was consumed by extreme jealousy, while early Harte biographer Henry C. Merwin privately concluded that she was "almost impossible to live with".

The well-known minister Thomas Starr King recommended Harte to James T. Fields, editor of the prestigious magazine The Atlantic Monthly, which published Harte's first short story in October 1863. In 1864, Harte joined with Charles Henry Webb in starting a new literary journal called The Californian. He became friends with and mentored poet Ina Coolbrith.

In 1865, Harte was asked by bookseller Anton Roman to edit a book of California poetry; it was to be a showcase of the finest California writers. When the book, called Outcroppings, was published, it contained only 19 poets, many of them Harte's friends (including Ina Coolbrith and Charles Warren Stoddard). The book caused some controversy, as Harte used the preface as a vehicle to attack California's literature, blaming the state's "monotonous climate" for its bad poetry. While the book was widely praised in the East, many newspapers and poets in the West took umbrage at his remarks.

In 1868, Harte became editor of The Overland Monthly, another new literary magazine, published by Roman Anton with the intention of highlighting local writings. The Overland Monthly was more in tune with the pioneering spirit of excitement in California. Harte's short story "The Luck of Roaring Camp" appeared in the magazine's second issue, propelling him to fame nationwide and in Europe.

When word of Charles Dickens's death reached Harte in July 1870, he immediately sent a dispatch across the bay to San Francisco to hold back the forthcoming issue of the Overland Monthly for 24 hours so that he could compose the poetic tribute "Dickens in Camp".

Harte's fame increased with the publication of his satirical poem "Plain Language from Truthful James" in the September 1870 issue of the Overland Monthly. The poem became better known by its alternate title "The Heathen Chinee" after being republished in a Boston newspaper in 1871. It was also quickly republished in a number of other newspapers and journals, including the New York Evening Post, the New York Tribune, the Boston Evening Transcript, the Providence Journal, the Hartford Courant, Prairie Farmer, and The Saturday Evening Post. The poem was a fictional representation of attacks on Chinese immigrants and Harte intended to the reader to sympathize with the victim, the character Ah Sin. Instead, readers identified with the attacker, the character William Nye. Harte later referred to the piece as "the worst poem I ever wrote, possibly the worst poem anyone ever wrote."

Like "Plain Language from Truthful James", Harte's 1874 short story "Wan Lee, the Pagan" also sought to undermine stereotypes about Chinese immigrants and to portray white Americans as the true savages.

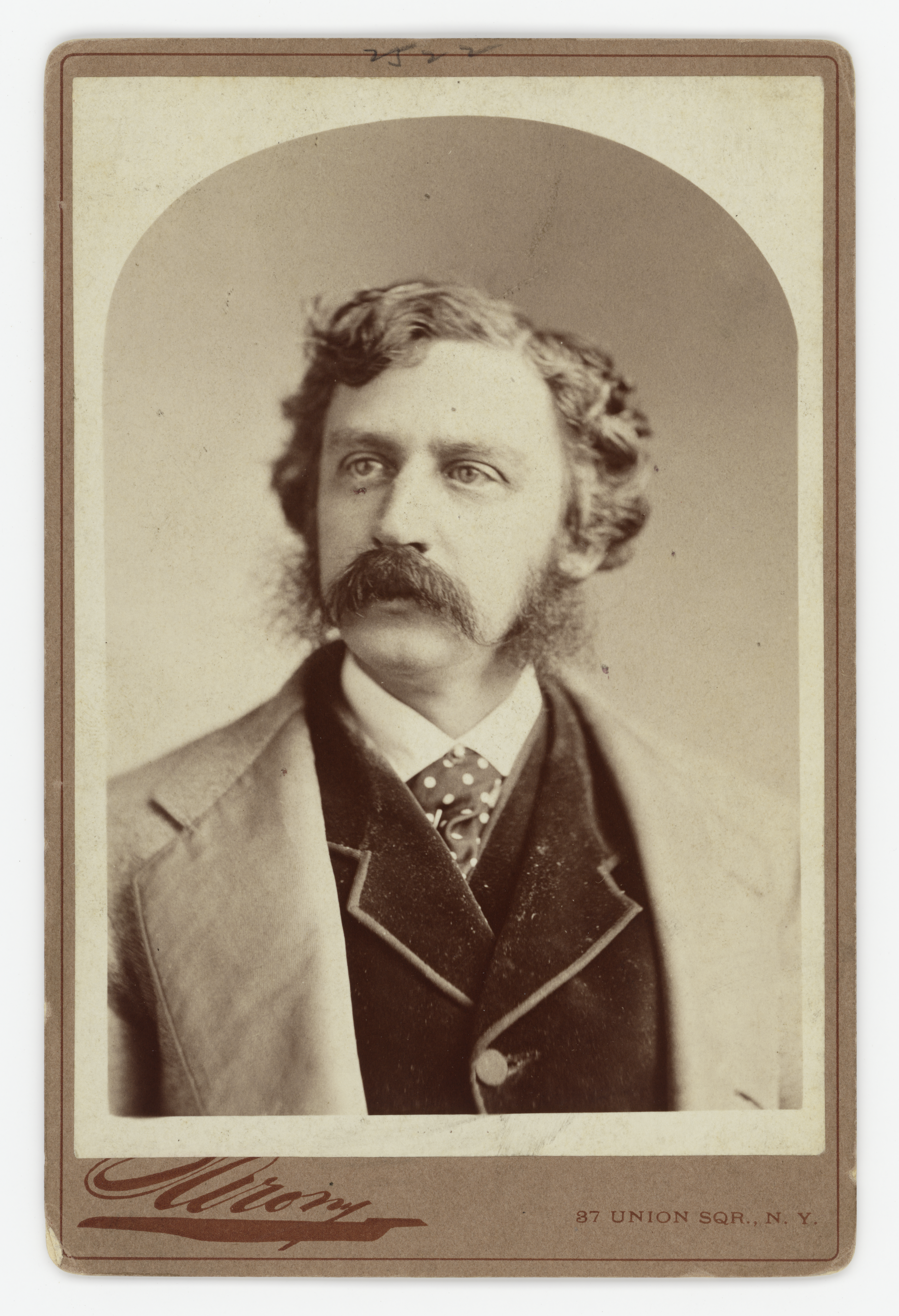
Portrait of Bret Harte by Napoleon Sarony (c. 1870). Housed at the National Portrait Gallery (United States)

== Move east ==
Harte was determined to pursue his literary career and traveled back east with his family in 1871 to New York and eventually to Boston, where he contracted with the publisher of The Atlantic Monthly for an annual salary of $10,000, "an unprecedented sum at the time". His popularity waned and, by the end of 1872, he was without a publishing contract and increasingly desperate. He spent the next few years struggling to publish new work or republish old and delivering lectures about the gold rush. The winter of 1877–78 was particularly hard for him and his family. He recalled it as a "hand-to-mouth life" and wrote to his wife Anna, "I don't know—looking back—what ever kept me from going down, in every way, during that awful December and January".

Some time between 1872 and 1881, Harte rented the Willows, a Morristown, New Jersey mansion then owned by Union general and author Joseph Warren Revere. Harte's time in Morristown inspired him to write an 1877 historical romance novel, Thankful Blossom.

After months of soliciting for such a role, Harte accepted the position of United States Consul in the town of Krefeld, Germany, in May 1878. Mark Twain had been a friend and supporter of Harte's until a substantial falling out, and he had previously tried to block any appointment for Harte. In a letter to William Dean Howells, he complained that Harte would be an embarrassment to the United States because, as he wrote, "Harte is a liar, a thief, a swindler, a snob, a sot, a sponge, a coward, a Jeremy Diddler, he is brim full of treachery... To send this nasty creature to puke upon the American name in a foreign land is too much". Eventually, Harte was given a similar role in Glasgow in 1880. In 1885 he settled in London. Throughout his time in Europe, he regularly wrote to his wife and children and sent monthly financial contributions. He declined to invite them to join him, nor did he return to the United States to visit them. His excuses were usually related to money. During the 24 years that he spent in Europe, he never abandoned writing and maintained a prodigious output of stories that retained the freshness of his earlier work. Among his writings of this time were parodies and satires of other writers, including "The Stolen Cigar-Case" featuring ace detective "Hemlock Jones", which Ellery Queen praised as "probably the best parody of Sherlock Holmes ever written".

He died in Camberley, England, in 1902 of throat cancer and is buried at Frimley. His wife Anna (née Griswold) Harte died on August 2, 1920. The couple lived together only 16 of the 40 years that they were married.

== Reception ==
In 1878, Andrew Carnegie praised Harte in Round the World as uniquely American, likely alluding to his regionalism:

"A whispering pine of the Sierras transplanted to Fifth Avenue! How could it grow? Although it shows some faint signs of life, how sickly are the leaves! As for fruit, there is none. America had in Bret Harte its most distinctively national poet."

Rudyard Kipling also showed himself to be an admirer of Harte's writing. In From Sea to Sea and Other Sketches, Letters of Travel, while in San Francisco Kipling wrote:

"A reporter asked me what I thought of the city, and I made answer suavely that it was hallowed ground to me because of Bret Harte. That was true: 'Well,' said the reporter, 'Bret Harte claims California, but California don't claim Bret Harte. ...' He could not understand that to the outside world the city was worth a great deal less than the man."

Mark Twain characterized him and his writing as insincere. Writing in his autobiography four years after Harte's death, Twain criticized the miners' dialect used by Harte, claiming that it never existed outside of his imagination. Additionally, Twain accused Harte of "borrowing" money from his friends with no intention of repaying it and of financially abandoning his wife and children. He referred repeatedly to Harte as "The Immortal Bilk".

== Selected works ==
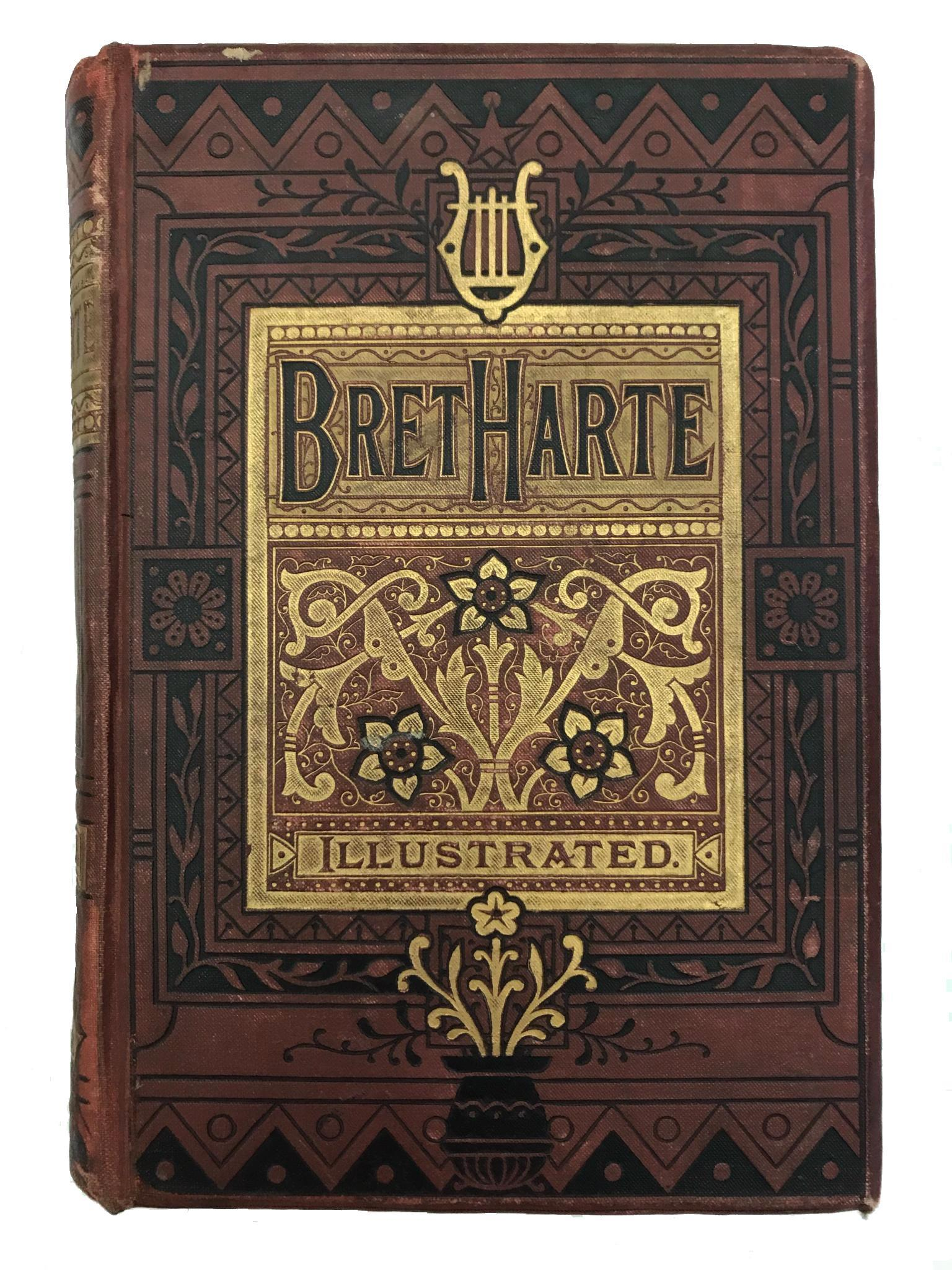
19th-century publishers binding on a book by Bret Harte

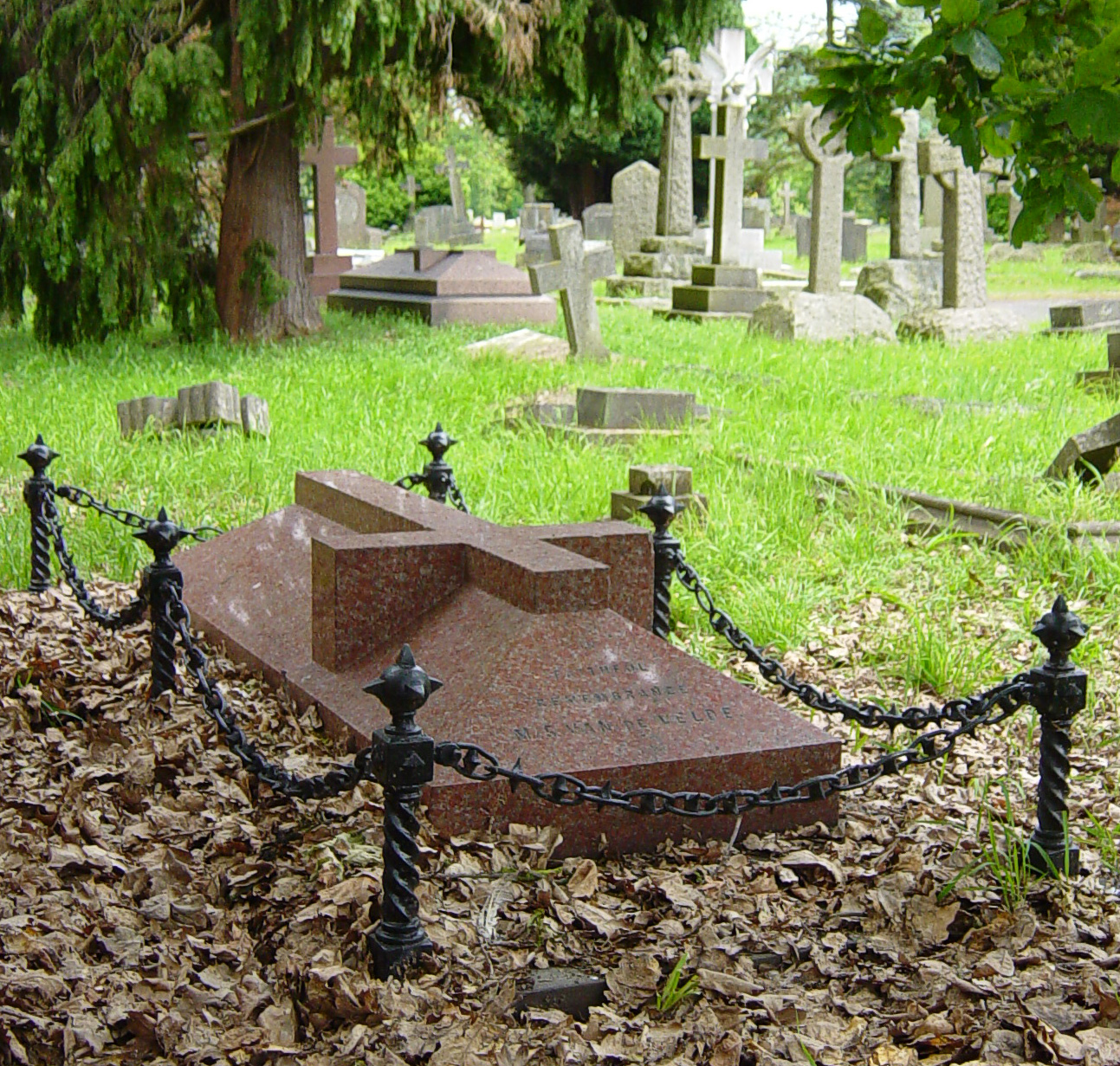
Bret Harte's gravestone in the churchyard of St Peter's Church, Frimley, Surrey, England

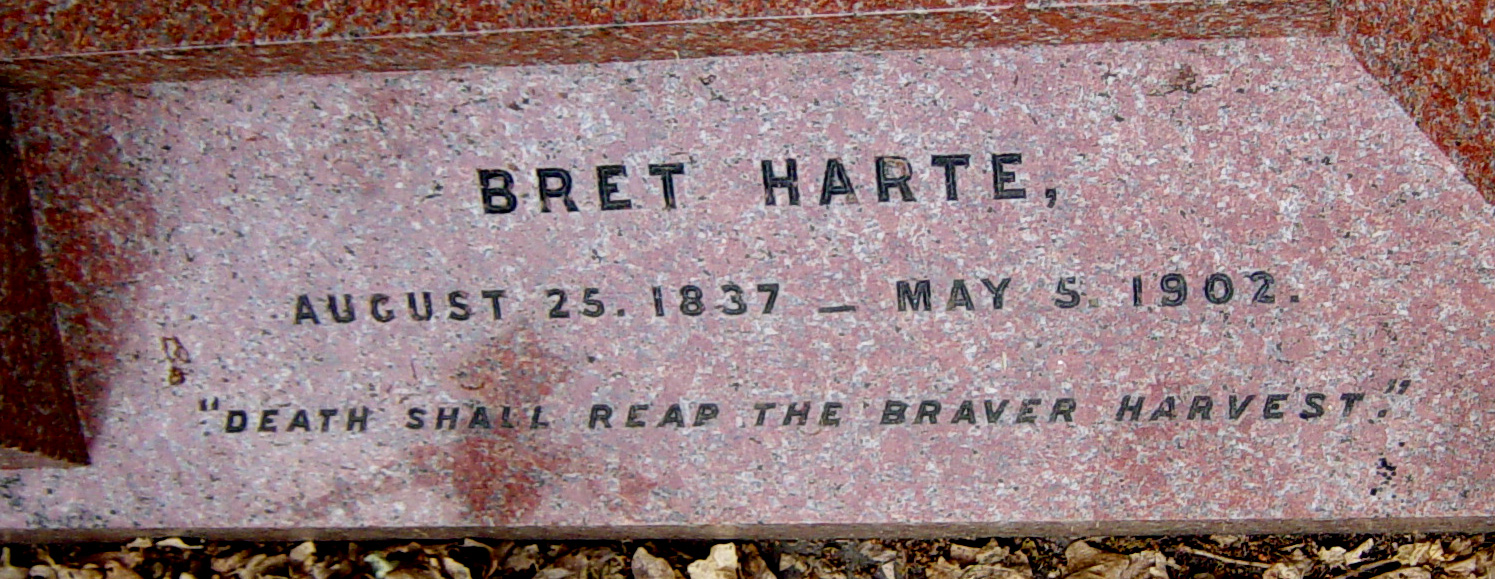
Inscription on gravestone: "Death shall reap the braver harvest."

- Outcroppings (1865), editor
- Condensed Novels and Other Papers (1867)
- Tennessee's Partner (short story; 1869)
- The Luck of Roaring Camp, and Other Sketches (1870)
- "Plain Language from Truthful James", aka "The Heathen Chinee" (1870)
- East and West: Poems (1871)
- The Heart's Foundation (1873)
- The Tales of the Argonauts (1875)
- Gabriel Conroy (1876)
- Two Men of Sandy Bar (1876)
- Thankful Blossom (1877)
- The Story of a Mine (1877)
- Drift from Two Shores (1878)
- An Heiress of Red Dog, and Other Tales (1879)
- Flip and Found at Blazing Star (1882)
- By Shore and Sedge (1885)
- A Millionaire of Rough-And-Ready and Devil's Ford (1887)
- The Crusade of the Excelsior (1887)
- The Argonauts of North Liberty (1888)
- Cressy (1889)
- A Ward of the Golden Gate (1890)
- A First Family of Tasajara (1892)
- Colonel Starbottle's Client, and some other people (1892)
- A Protégée of Jack Hamlin's; and Other Stories (1894)
- Barker's Luck etc. (1896)
- Tales of Trail and Town (1898)
- Stories in Light and Shadow (1898)
- Mr. Jack Hamlin's Mediation; and Other Stories (1899)
- Under the Red-Woods (1901)
- Her Letter, His Answer, and Her Last Letter (1905)

=== Parodies ===
Harte's short story collections Condensed Novels (1867) and Condensed Novels: Second Series New Burlesques (1902) are parodies of contemporaneous writers and novels.

Condensed Novels (1867)
Parody	Named author	Parodied author	Parodied novel	Remarks
Muck-a-Muck - A Modern Indian Novel	After Cooper	James Fenimore Cooper		
Terence Denville	Ch—l—s L—v—r	Charles Lever		
Selina Sedilia	Miss M. E. B—dd-n and Mrs. H-n-y W—d	Mary Elizabeth Braddon and Mrs. Henry Wood	The melodramatic style of both authors in novels such as Lady Audley's Secret and East Lynne is parodied.	Mrs Henry Wood (Ellen Wood) is best known as the author of East Lynne.
The Ninety-Nine Guardsmen	Al-x-d-r D-m-s	Alexandre Dumas	Twenty Years After	
The Dweller of the Threshold	Sir Ed——d L–tt–n B–lw–r	Edward Bulwer-Lytton	Zanoni	The figure of the Guardian of the Threshold in Zanoni.
The Haunted Man - A Christmas Story	Ch–r—s D–ck–n–s	Charles Dickens	A Christmas Carol	
Miss Mix	Ch—l—tte Br—nte	Charlotte Brontë	Jane Eyre	Mr. Rawjester is obviously Mr. Rochester
Guy Heavystone; or, "Entire." A Muscular Novel.	The Author of "Sword and Gun."			
Mr. Midshipman Breezy - A Naval Officer	Captain M-rry-t, R.N.	Captain Frederick Marryat	Mr Midshipman Easy	
John Jenkins; or, The Smoker Reformed.	T. S. A—th—r.	Timothy Shay Arthur	Ten Nights in a Bar-Room and What I Saw There	T. S. Arthur was a noted temperance author. The parody exhorts the rejection of tobacco.
No Title	W-lk-e C-ll-ns	Wilkie Collins	No Name	
N. N.	Being a novel in the French paragraphic style.			
Fantine.	After the French of Victor Hugo.	Victor Hugo	Les Misérables	Fantine is the first volume of Les Misérables.
"La Femme."	After the French of M. Michelet.	Jules Michelet	La Femme	
Mary McGillup - A Southern Novel	After Belle Boyd - With an introduction by G. A. S-la	Maria Isabella Boyd and George Augustus Sala	Belle Boyd in Camp and Prison	
Handsome is as Handsome Does.	Ch-s R—de.	Charles Reade		
Lothaw; or The Adventures of a Young Gentleman in Search of a Religion.	Mr. Benjamins.	Benjamin Disraeli	Lothair	
The Hoodlum Band; or, The Boy Chief, the Infant Politician, and the Pirate Prodigy				

Condensed Novels: Second Series New Burlesques (1902)
Parody	Named author	Parodied author	Parodied novel	Remarks
Rupert the Resembler	A-th-y H-pe	Anthony Hope	The Prisoner of Zenda and Rupert of Hentzau	
The Stolen Cigar Case	A. Co—n D—le	Arthur Conan Doyle	Sherlock Holmes stories	
Golly and the Christian or The Minx and the Manxman	H-ll C—ne	Hall Caine	The Christian and The Manxman	
Dan'l Borem	E. N-s W-t-t	Edward Noyes Westcott	David Harum	
Stories Three	R-dy-d K-pl-g	Rudyard Kipling	Soldiers Three	In the second story, "A Private's Honor", the three characters Mulledwiney, Bleareyed, and Otherwise parody Learoyd, Mulvaney and Ortheris of Soldiers Three. The story title, "A Private's Honor", references "His Private Honour" of Many Inventions, another Learoyd, Mulvaney and Ortheris story.
"Zut-Ski" The Problem of a Wicked Feme Sole	M-r-e C-r-lli	Marie Corelli	Ziska: The Problem of a Wicked Soul	

== Dramatic and musical adaptations ==
- Several film versions of "The Outcasts of Poker Flat" have been made, including one in 1937 with Preston Foster and another in 1952 with Dale Robertson.
- Tennessee's Partner (1955) with John Payne and Ronald Reagan was based on the story of the same name.
- Paddy Chayefsky's treatment of the film version of Paint Your Wagon seems to borrow from "Tennessee's Partner": two close friends—one named "Pardner"—share the same woman.
- The spaghetti Western Four of the Apocalypse is based on "The Outcasts of Poker Flat" and "The Luck of Roaring Camp".
- The Soviet movie Armed and Dangerous (Russian: Вооружён и очень опасен, 1977) is based on Gabriel Conroy and another of Harte's stories.
- Operas based on "The Outcasts of Poker Flat" include those by Samuel Adler and by Stanworth Beckler.
- The 1889 short story "Salomy Jane's Kiss" was adapted for the stage as Salomy Jane in 1907 by Paul Armstrong. The stage play was adapted for the 1910 novel of the same name, which has been filmed several times:
  - Salomy Jane (1914)
  - Salomy Jane (1923)
  - Wild Girl (1932)
- The actor John Carradine played the role of Bret Harte in the 1944 movie The Adventures of Mark Twain.
- The actor Craig Hill was cast as Harte in the 1956 episode, "Year of Destiny", on the syndicated anthology series Death Valley Days, hosted by Stanley Andrews. The "year of destiny" is 1857, when Harte arrived in California. First a stagecoach guard, then a newspaper editor and schoolteacher, he slowly finds fame as a western writer.
- The popular 1975 Disney film The Apple Dumpling Gang, based on the 1971 novel of the same name by Jack M. Bickham, is full of characters and situations inspired by Harte's writings. Among them are a "tomboy" stage driver, her Southern gentleman father, a roving gambler trusted with the care of small children, a world-weary sheriff who also serves as justice of the peace, and two bumbling but lovable outlaws. The film was a major hit for Disney.

== Legacy ==
- Bret Harte Memorial in San Francisco
- There is a Bret Harte House at the Cal Poly Humboldt Journalism Department in Arcata, California
- Bret Harte, California, a census-designated place (CDP) in Stanislaus County
- Twain Harte, a CDP in Tuolumne County, California, named after both Mark Twain and Bret Harte.
- The Mark Twain Bret Harte Historic Trail (Marker Number 431 erected in 1948 by the California Centennial Commission), also named after both writers.
- Bret Harte Village in the Gold River community of Sacramento County. Sacramento, California
- Bret Harte Court, a street in Sacramento, California
- Bret Harte Library, a public library in Long Beach, California
- Bret Harte Hall, Roaring Camp Railroads Felton, California
- Bret Harte High School in Angels Camp, California is named after him.
- Bret Harte Lane in Humboldt Hill, California.
- Bret Harte Elementary School in Chicago, Illinois
- Bret Harte Preparatory Middle School (Vermont Vista) South Los Angeles, California
- Bret Harte Middle School in San Jose, California
- Bret Harte Middle School in Oakland, California
- Bret Harte Middle School in Hayward, California
- Bret Harte Elementary in Corcoran, California
- Bret Harte Street in Baldwin, New York
- Bret Harte Elementary in San Francisco, California
- Bret Harte Elementary in Burbank, California
- Bret Harte Elementary in Cherry Hill, New Jersey
- Bret Harte Elementary in Sacramento, California
- Bret Harte Elementary School in Modesto, California
- A community called The Shores of Poker Flat, California claims to have been the location of Poker Flat, although it is usually accepted that the story takes place farther north.
- Bret Harte Road in Frimley (the town in which Harte was buried) is named after him.
- Bret Harte Place in San Francisco, California is named after him.
- Bret Harte Lane, Bret Harte Road, Bret Harte Park, Bret Ave and Harte Ave in San Rafael, California.
- Bret Harte Terrace in San Francisco.
- Bret Harte Road in Berkeley, California.
- Bret Harte Road in Redwood City, California.
- Bret Harte Road in Angels Camp, California.
- Bret Harte Road and Bret Harte Drive in Murphys, California.
- Bret Harte Avenue in Reno, Nevada.
- Bret Harte Alley in Arcata, California.
- Bret Harte Park in Danville, California.
- In 1987 Harte appeared on a $5 U.S. postage stamp, as part of the "Great Americans series" of issues.
