= The Outcasts of Poker Flat =

Short story by Bret Harte

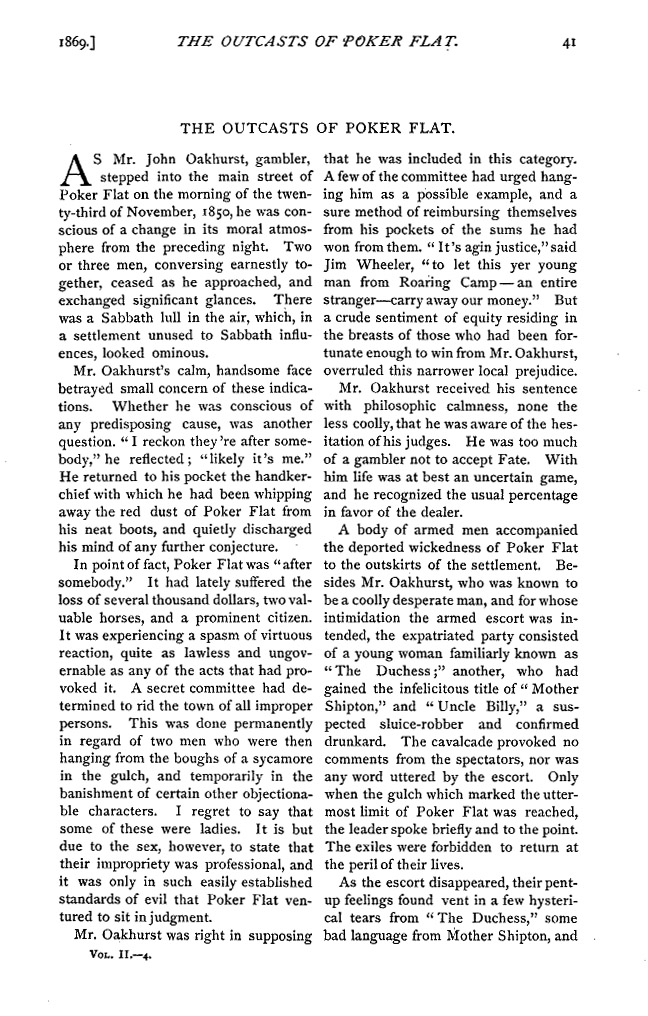
"The Outcasts of Poker Flat" from The Overland Monthly, January 1869

"The Outcasts of Poker Flat" (1869) is a short story written by author of the American West Bret Harte. An example of naturalism and local color of California during the first half of the nineteenth century, the story was first published in January 1869 in the magazine Overland Monthly. It was one of two short stories which brought the author national attention.

== Plot ==
The story takes place in a Californian community known as Poker Flat, near the town of La Porte. Following the loss of several thousand dollars and two horses, and the death of a notable resident, the town has formed a secret committee to rid itself of any "improper" people, hanging two and banishing others. On November 23, 1850, four such individuals are exiled from Poker Flat and warned not to return on pain of death. The first of them is a professional poker player, John Oakhurst, who has won large amounts from those on the secret committee. On his way out of town, he is joined by two women, the Duchess and Mother Shipton, and Uncle Billy, the town drunk and a suspected robber. These four set out for the Sandy Bar mining camp, a day's journey away over a mountain range. At noon, over Oakhurst's protests, the group stops for a rest.

While on their rest, the group is met by a pair of runaway lovers on their way to Poker Flat to get married, Tom Simson (known also as "The Innocent") and 15-year-old Piney Woods. Simson has met Oakhurst before and has great admiration for him, as Oakhurst won a great deal of money from Simson. Oakhurst had returned the money and urged Simson to quit gambling, as he was a terrible player. Nonetheless, Simson is thrilled to have come upon Oakhurst on this day and decides that he and Piney will stay with the group for a while. They are unaware of the group's status as exiles, and Simson assumes that the Duchess is Oakhurst's wife, to the amusement of Uncle Billy.

A decision is made for everyone to stay the night together, and the group takes shelter in a half-built cabin Simson has discovered. In the middle of the night, Oakhurst wakes up and sees a heavy snowstorm raging. Looking around, he realizes that Uncle Billy has fled with the group's horses and mules. They are all now forced to wait out the storm with provisions that will likely only last for another 10 days. After a week in the cabin, Mother Shipton dies, having secretly and altruistically starved herself in order to give her rations to Piney. Oakhurst fashions some snowshoes for Simson to use in traveling to Poker Flat for help, telling the others he will accompany the young man part of the way. The "law of Poker Flat" finally arrives at the cabin, only to find the Duchess and Piney frozen to death and embracing in a peaceful repose. They look so peaceful and innocent that the onlookers cannot tell which of them had been exiled for her immoral behavior.

Oakhurst commits suicide under a tree by shooting himself through the heart with his derringer. A playing card, the two of clubs, is found pinned to the trunk with a note written on it:

BENEATH THIS TREE LIES THE BODY OF JOHN OAKHURST, WHO STRUCK A STREAK OF BAD LUCK ON THE 23rd OF NOVEMBER, 1850, AND HANDED IN HIS CHECKS ON THE 7TH DECEMBER, 1850.

== Film, TV or theatrical adaptations ==
Harte's story has been brought to film at least five times, including in 1919 with Harry Carey, in 1937 with Preston Foster, and in 1952 with Dale Robertson. The Spaghetti Western Four of the Apocalypse is based on this story and another of Harte's stories, "The Luck of Roaring Camp".

Operas based on The Outcasts of Poker Flat include those by Samuel Adler, Jaromir Weinberger, Stanworth Beckler, and Andrew Earle Simpson.
