= Overland Monthly =

Magazine of the western United States

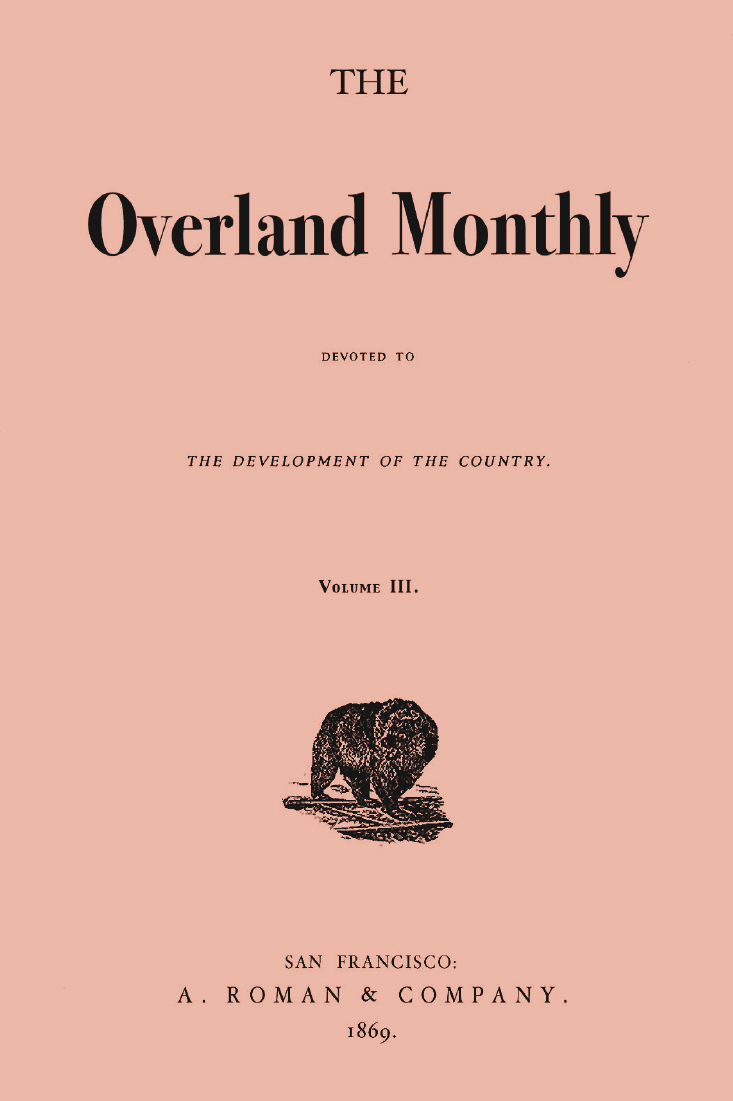
The Overland Monthly, 1869

The Overland Monthly was a monthly literary and cultural magazine, based in California, United States. It was founded in 1868 and published between the second half of the 19th century and the first half of the 20th century.

== History ==
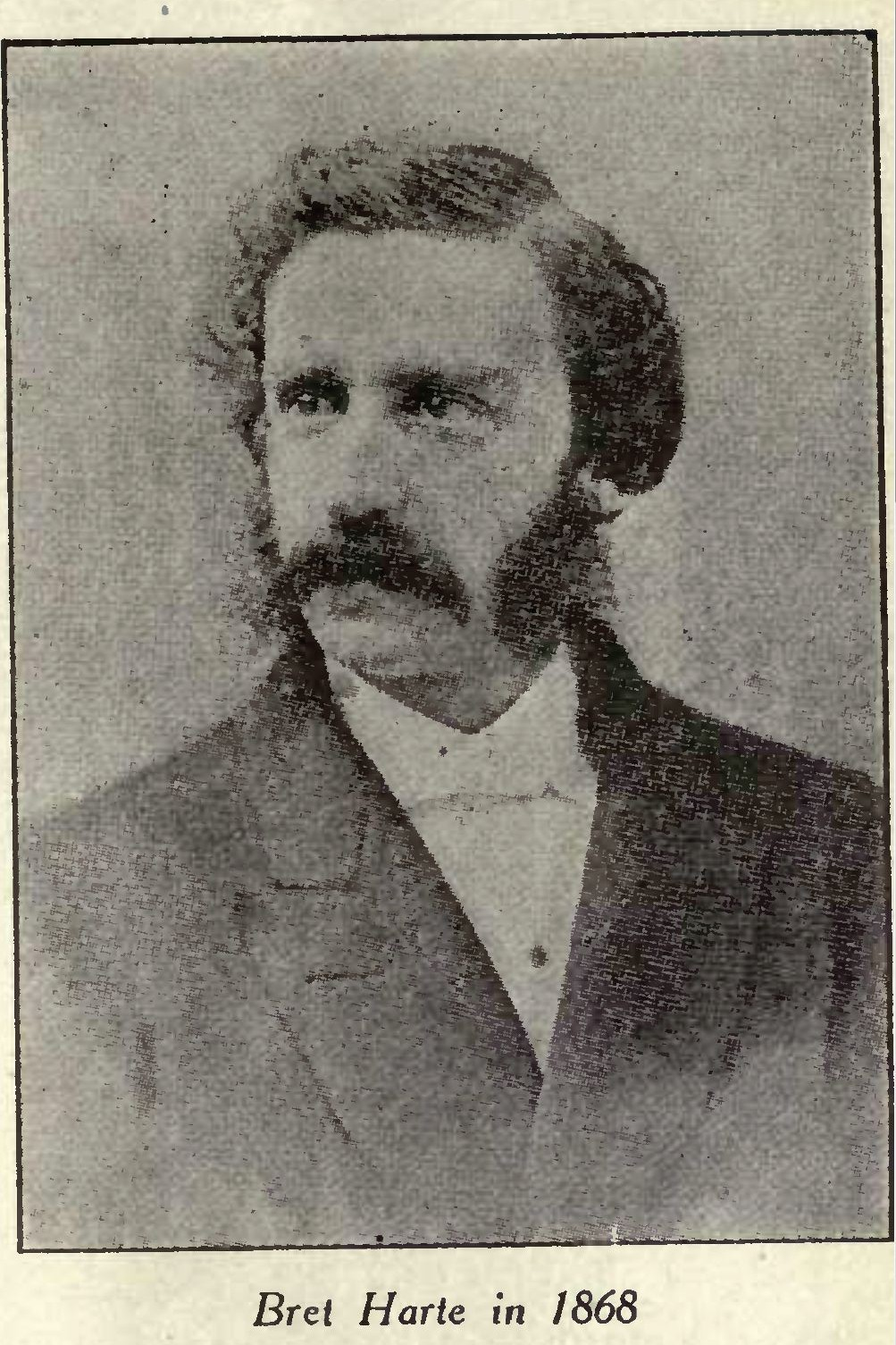
Bret Harte, 1868

The Overland Monthly was founded in 1868 by Anton Roman, a Bavarian-born bookseller who moved to California during the Gold Rush. He had recently published the poems of Charles Warren Stoddard and a collection of verse by California writers called Outcroppings. The magazine's first issue was published in July 1868, edited by Bret Harte in San Francisco, and continued until late 1875. Roman, who hoped his magazine would "help the material development of this Coast", was originally concerned that Harte would "lean too much toward the purely literary". Harte, who had been editor of both The Golden Era and The Californian, was in turn skeptical at first that there would be enough quality content provided from local authors. The first issue included contributions from the "Golden State Trinity": Harte, Stoddard, and Ina Coolbrith.

Despite the positive response from critics and the magazine's profitability, publisher Anton Roman sold the Overland Monthly in June 1869 for $7,500 to John Carmany. Harte immediately offered the new owner a list of demands, including a raise to $200 a month and a guarantee of his complete editorial control of each issue. Carmany agreed to his terms, and Harte was able to leave his job at the San Francisco Mint to devote his full attention to the Overland Monthly. The publication continued to thrive in this period; Mark Twain reported that he had "heard it handsomely praised by some of the most ponderous of America's literary chiefs."

In the September 1870 issue, Harte published what became his most well-known work, "Plain Language from Truthful James", later known as "The Heathen Chinee". That year, with his popularity soaring, Harte considered a professorship at the University of California, Berkeley or an offer to purchase the Overland Monthly, but declined both. Instead, he left California and traveled east to seek broader literary fame.

The original publishers, in 1880, started The Californian, which became The Californian and Overland Monthly in October 1882. In January 1883, the effort reverted to The Overland Monthly (starting again with Volume I, number 1). The 1884 volume contained a commitment to present content "free of advertising taint," explaining that no article would appear that was not "in good faith what it appears to be." Milicent Shinn wrote about her years as editor from 1883 to 1894.

The Overland Monthly was based in San Francisco until at least 1921. In 1923 the magazine merged with Out West to become Overland Monthly and the Out West magazine, and ended publication in July 1935.

== Contributors ==
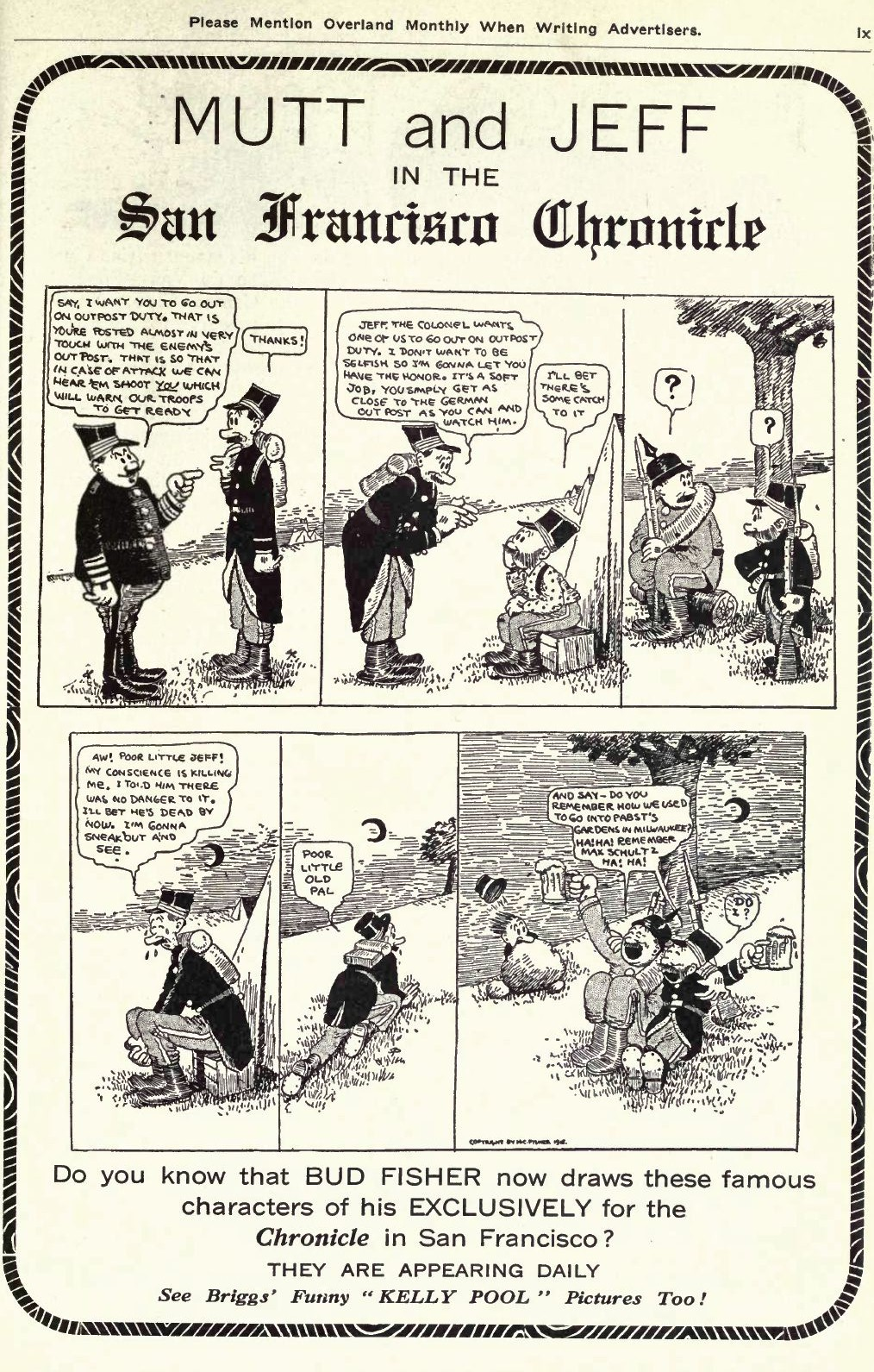
SF Chronicle Mutt and Jeff advertisement in the Overland, 1916

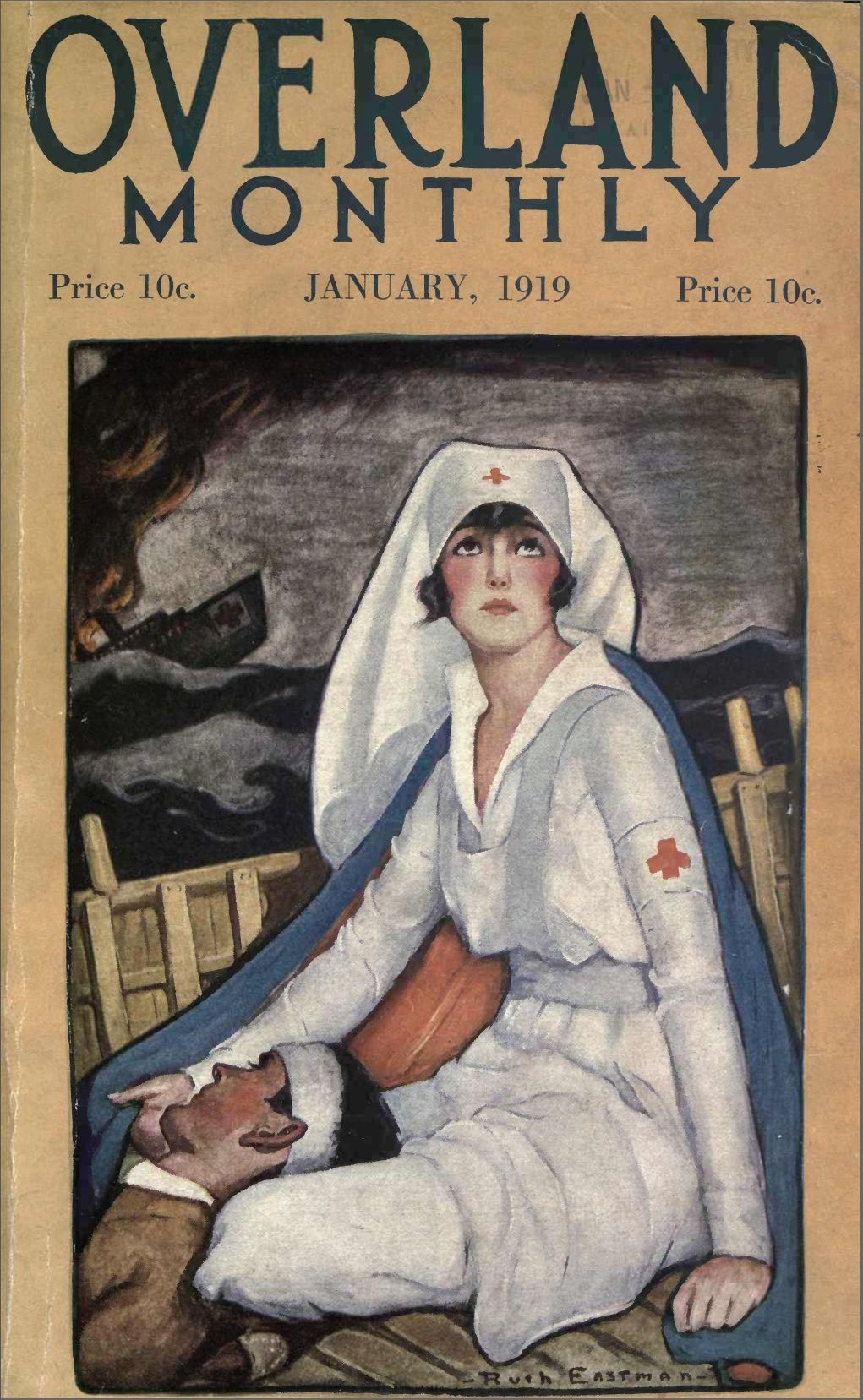
Overland Monthly, January 1919

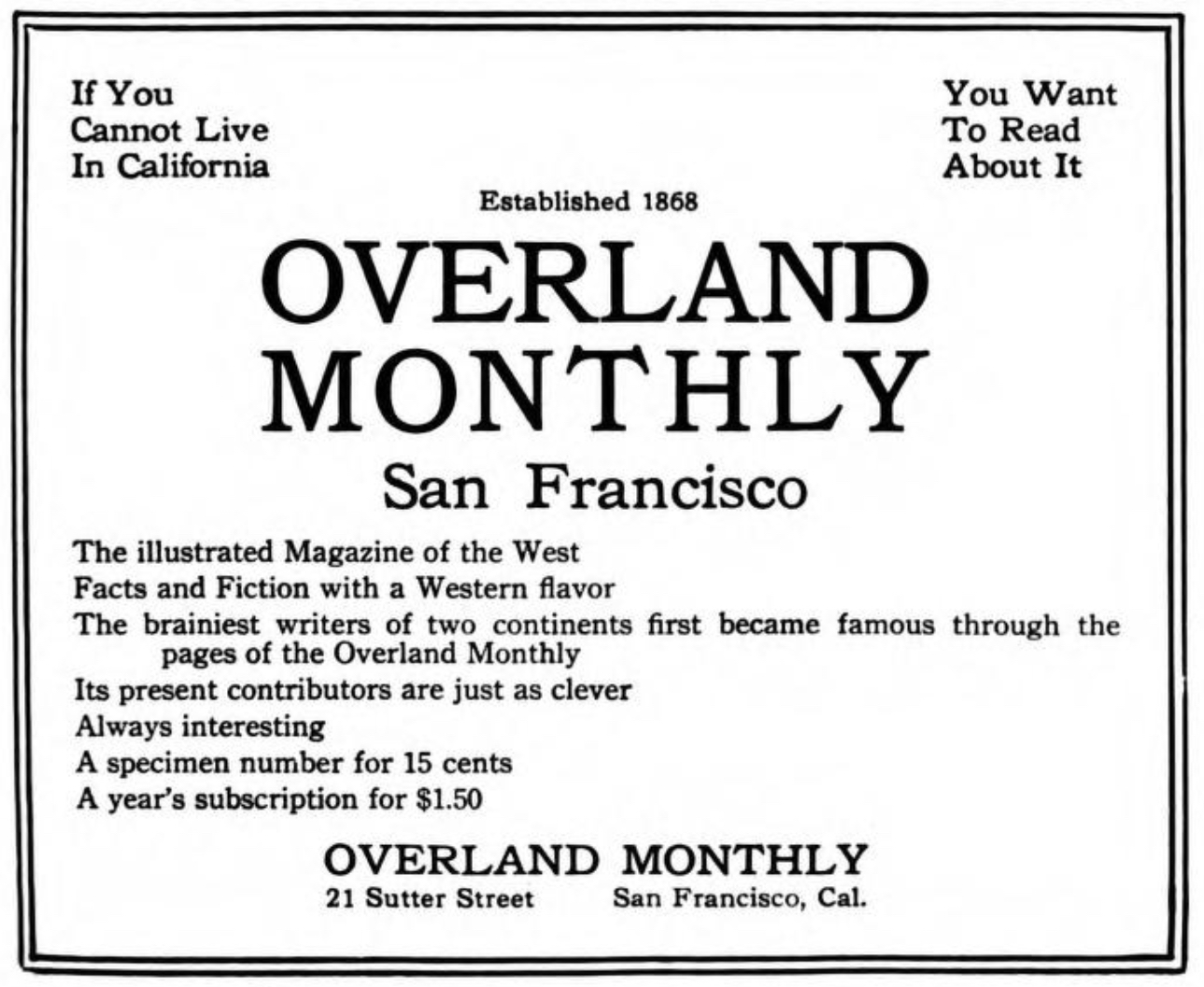
Overland Monthly advertisement in The Black Cat of April 1912

Noted writers, editors, and artists associated with the magazine included:

- Robert Ingersoll Aitken
- Ambrose Bierce
- Noah Brooks
- Alice Cary
- Willa Cather
- Charles W. Chesnutt
- Frona Eunice Wait Colburn
- Bret Harte
- Ina Coolbrith
- Maynard Dixon
- Edgar Fawcett
- Henry George
- Robinson Jeffers
- John Brayshaw Kaye
- Charmian Kittredge
- Netta Eames
- Clarence King
- Kinahan Cornwallis
- Jack London
- Lannie Haynes Martin
- Josephine Clifford McCracken
- Joaquin Miller
- John Muir
- Hugo Wilhelm Arthur Nahl
- Lola Ridge
- Charles Taze Russell
- Stephen Powers
- William Saroyan
- Herman George Scheffauer
- Charles Howard Shinn
- Milicent Shinn
- Edward Rowland Sill
- Clark Ashton Smith
- Josephine Spencer
- George Sterling
- Charles Warren Stoddard
- Augustus Gabriel de Vivier Tassin
- Douglas Tilden
- Mark Twain
- Frances Fuller Victor
- Laura Lyon White
- Joseph Widney

Editors include:

- Milicent Shinn 1883-1894
- Rounsevelle Wildman, editor 1894-1897
- James Howard Bridge, editor 1897-1900
