= George Sterling =

American poet and playwright (1869–1926)

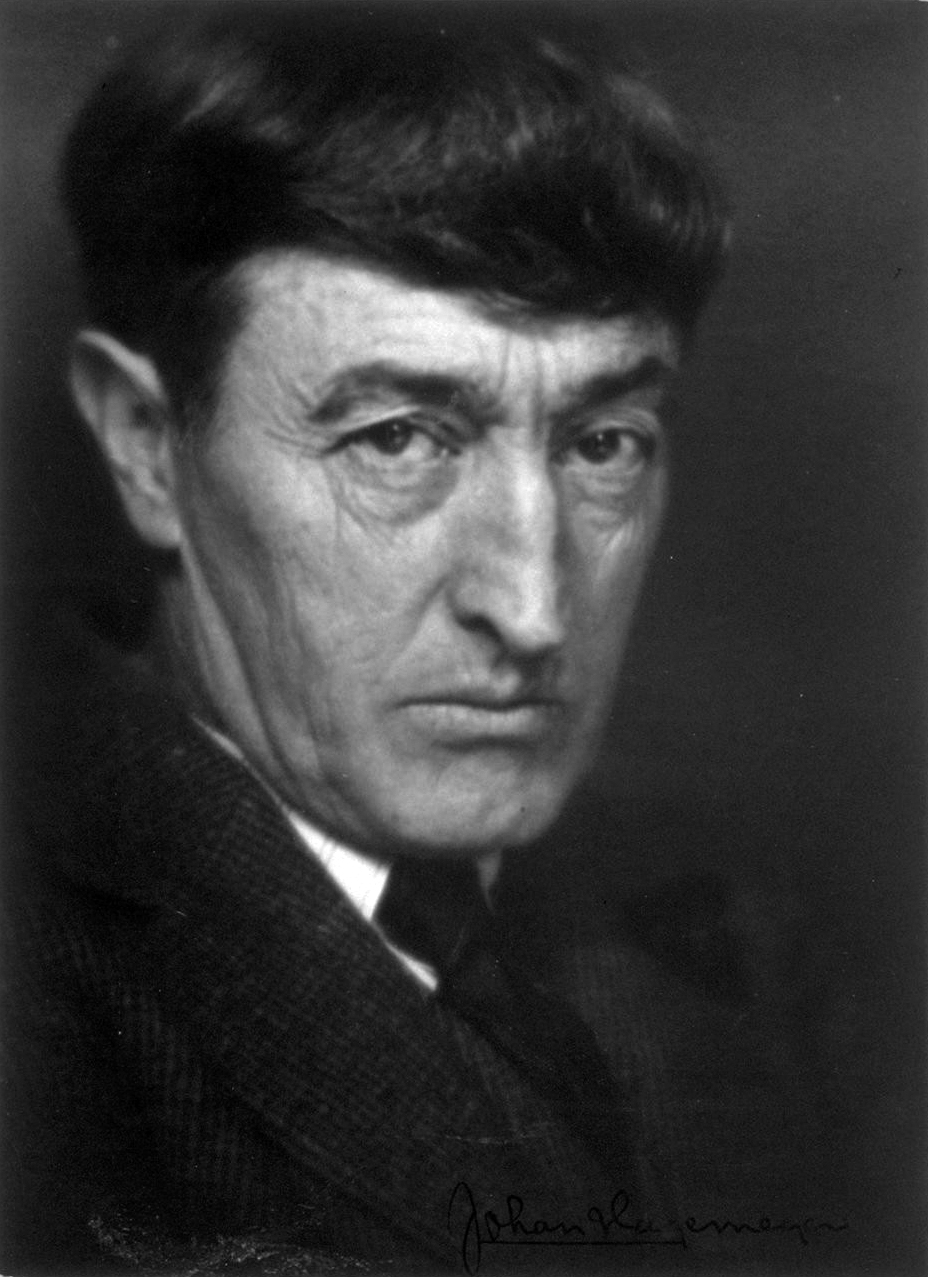
- Sterling shortly before his death in 1926. Photo by Johann Hagemeyer.
- Born: George Augustine Sterling III; December 1, 1869; Sag Harbor, Suffolk County, New York, U.S.
- Died: November 17, 1926 (aged 56); San Francisco, California, U.S.
- Resting place: Cypress Room, Chapel of Memories Columbarium, Oakland, California
- Education: St. Charles College (Maryland) (no degree) College of Physicians and Surgeons (no degree)
- Occupations: Writer; poet; playwright; business executive
- Spouse: Caroline "Carrie" Eugenie Rand (m. 1896; div. 1914)
- Relatives: George Ansel Sterling Ryerson, first cousin, once removed
- Writing career
- Years active: 1896–1926
- Genres: lyric poetry (sonnet, elegy, ode, epigram, obituary poetry); narrative poetry (ballad, fantasy, horror, supernatural); humorous verse (light verse, parody, satire); song (dirge, drinking song, novelty song, love song); verse drama; blank verse; allegory; essay; short story; prehistoric fiction
- Notable works: "The Testimony of the Suns"; "A Wine of Wizardry"; The House of Orchids and Other Poems; "The Black Vulture"; The Play of Everyman; Lilith; Truth (two versions)
- Movements: Cosmicism; Bohemianism; Romanticism; Dark Romanticism; Socialism

George Sterling (December 1, 1869 – November 17, 1926) was a prominent American poet, an acclaimed playwright, and a proponent of Bohemianism during the first quarter of the twentieth century. His work was admired by writers as diverse as Ambrose Bierce, Theodore Dreiser, Robinson Jeffers, Sinclair Lewis, Jack London, H. P. Lovecraft, H. L. Mencken, Upton Sinclair, and Clark Ashton Smith. Sterling worked mostly in California's San Francisco Bay Area and Carmel-by-the-Sea, but also spent time as a writer in New York City, Sag Harbor, Los Angeles, and Hollywood. He influenced many writers. In addition, Sterling played a major role in the growth of the California cities of Oakland, Piedmont, and Carmel-by-the-Sea.

== Literary career and critical responses ==
During George Sterling's thirty-year career as a writer, he wrote songs, plays, movies, short stories, essays, and more than a thousand poems. His works were published in most American literary magazines, in more than a hundred newspapers, in anthologies, and in his own books. He earned several literary awards.

Although some critics of his time dismissed Sterling's poems (In Freeman magazine, poet John Gould Fletcher called him "a versifier lavishing his craft on subjects beneath the dignity of a true poet"), other media reviewers regarded Sterling's works highly (Atlanta Constitution: "There is no doubt at all about the genius of George Sterling"; New York Times: "Ambrose Bierce has been hailing Mr. Sterling for some years past as the greatest poet on this side of the Atlantic ... Mr. Bierce's hail seems likely to be justified"). Sterling's works were admired by such prominent writers as Jack London ("the greatest living poet in the United States"), Upton Sinclair ("His work possess the qualities of the greatest poetry: sublimity of thought, intensity of emotion, enchanting melody, and severe and reverent workmanship"), Theodore Dreiser ("The ranking American poet, greater than any we have thus far produced"), and H. L. Mencken ("He was one of our greatest poets. ... I had tremendous respect for his work and an admiration for his style").

After Sterling's death, Australian poet Sydney Elliott Napier wrote: "Sterling died only recently, leaving behind him a great name locally and an output of verse which undoubtedly contains much that must live, and some of it, indeed, worthy to be ranked among the finest expressions of the American muse."

Sterling wrote about a vast variety of topics in different poetic styles that evolved throughout his writing career.

=== Poet in training, 1896–1901 ===
At age 26, San Francisco business executive George Sterling became obsessed with a new passion. He wanted to write serious poetry inspired by his poetic heroes such as John Keats and Edgar Allan Poe. Sterling wrote his first poems after his February 1896 marriage. He knew eminent literary critic Ambrose Bierce and asked permission to send him poems for evaluation. Bierce replied: "Of course you may send me verses—a bellyful if you like." Sterling mailed Bierce dozens of poems and Bierce replied with detailed, precise comments.

Bierce appreciated one Sterling poem enough to include it in his February 21, 1897 San Francisco Examiner column. The poem, "Farewell", reflected on a dead friend's passing and the absence or presence of an afterlife. It was Sterling's first appearance in print. Between 1897 and 1901, Sterling wrote many poems but, usually dissatisfied, let only a handful become published. For thirteen years Bierce reviewed and commented on Sterling's poems, teaching his protégé poetic skills and shaping his artistic preferences.

=== Bierce's protégé, 1901–1910 ===
On April 11, 1901, Sterling mailed a new poem titled "Memorial Day, 1901" to Bierce for criticism. His mentor responded: "It is great—great!—the loftiest note that you have struck and held." Bierce arranged for the Washington Post to publish the poem and wrote a preface explaining that though Sterling was a new poet, "he has written a considerable body of verse. Not all of it has the strength, fire, and elevation of the remarkable poem printed here, but none has been delinquent in the matter of 'that something other than the sense' which distinguishes poetry from mere verse. George Sterling is a poet, and a great one—one may safely stake on that all the reputation for literary judgment that one may hope to have." The appearance of "Memorial Day, 1901" in The Washington Post was Sterling's first publication of a major poem. It marked his entry into a new stage of development as a writer. After five years writing practice poems, Sterling at age 31 determined to become a writer of serious, elevated verse.

==== "The Testimony of the Suns" ====
Sterling loved astronomy because "my dear dead father was greatly interested in it, and I've spent many hours on the house-top with him and his telescope". He marveled at planets, stars, and galaxies—apparently resting in peace but actually slowly and endlessly colliding with and destroying each other. Sometime after December 16, 1901, Sterling began a long poem depicting the galaxies and stars of "the stellar universe at strife, when to the eye it is a symbol of such peace and changelessness ... It surely is a war if the cosmic processes are viewed as a whole." The long poem, "The Testimony of the Suns", is a lengthy astronomical poem that combines elements of science, fantasy, science fiction, and philosophy. Literary historian S. T. Joshi called it Sterling's "longest poem and one of his greatest".

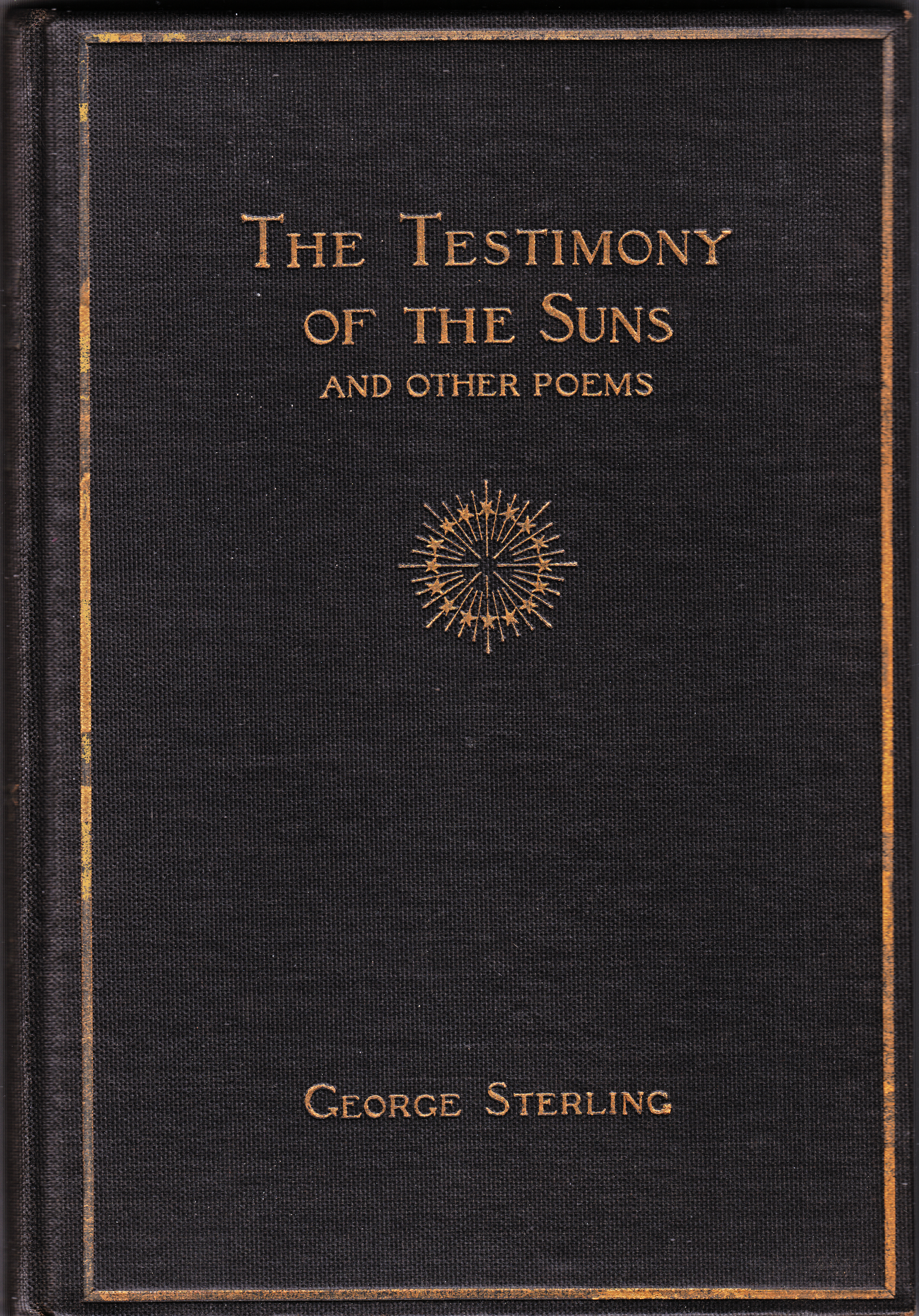
1903 The Testimony of the Suns and Other Poems by George Sterling, first edition

The unusual poem was too long for magazines and was rejected by book publishers, so in 1903 Sterling self-published it in his first book, The Testimony of the Suns and Other Poems. When his book was released, Sterling's poems had been published in newspapers and magazines for seven years, but "The Testimony of the Suns" marked the first time Sterling's poetry attracted nationwide attention from critics. The New York Times said Sterling's poetry has "the note of character that promises permanence". Book News Monthly said his book "in every part rings true to the nature of man. The poems are often of great lyrical beauty and always have some music to them." Impressions Quarterly began its review: "A poet of the first magnitude has risen." "There is no doubt at all about the genius of George Sterling", proclaimed The Atlanta Constitution. The nationwide critical success of "The Testimony of the Suns" established Sterling's career as a poet.

==== The Triumph of Bohemia ====
On August 18, 1905 Sterling and his wife Carrie moved from Piedmont, California to Carmel-by-the-Sea. In December the Bohemian Club asked Sterling to write a play for its 1906 Midsummer Jinks. Sterling wrote the first half in one day. By December 17, he had almost finished a first draft of his entire verse play. He took it to the Bohemian Club members responsible for the Jinks. After months of extensive changes, they agreed to stage Sterling's fantasy as the Club's 1906 summer presentation. However, in 1906 everything changed. The April 18, 1906 San Francisco earthquake and fire burned Alexander Robertson's bookstore to the ground. All but 200 copies of the second edition of The Testimony of the Suns and Other Poems were destroyed.

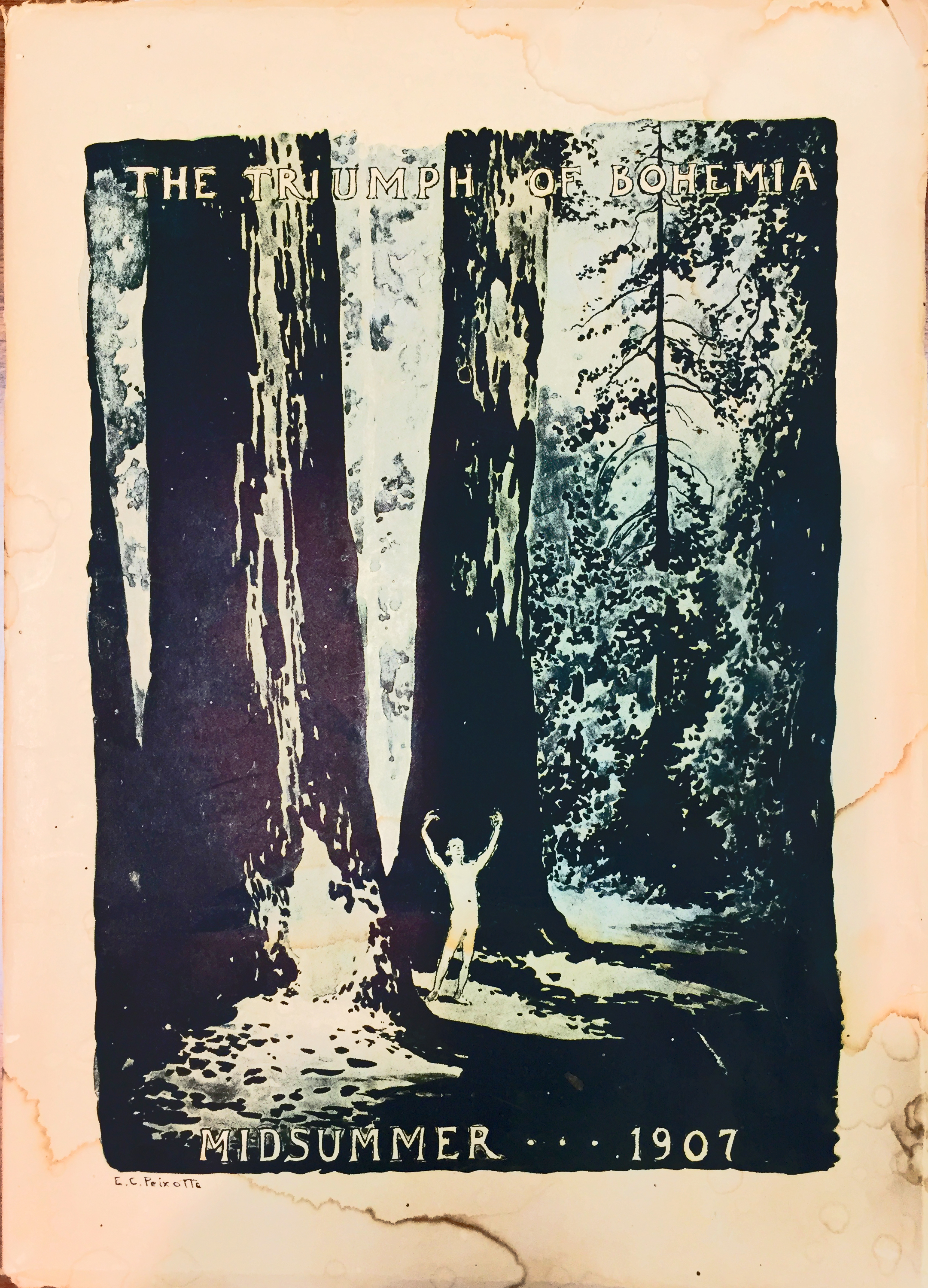
1907 July 27: Front cover of The Triumph of Bohemia by George Sterling. Cover art by Ernest Peixotto.

Earthquake destruction meant the Bohemian Club could not prepare Sterling's play The Triumph of Bohemia: A Forest Play, so the Club postponed it a year to the night of July 27, 1907. That night after dark about 600 Bohemian Club members gathered on log benches in Bohemian Grove, the Club's private redwood forest. Slowly, stage lights imitating moonbeams faded in, causing figures on the Grove's large stage to become discernible as sleeping tree-spirits. The play's story pitted tree-spirits and their trees against the efforts of winds, time, fire, lumberjacks, and Mammon (greed) to destroy their forest. The trees are saved by an immense owl—the mascot of the Bohemian Club—and by the Spirit of Bohemia. The Bohemian Club printed copies of The Triumph of Bohemia for its members. "The climax of this year's play left the audience in an awed silence which most playwrights would give years of their lives to win from a professional audience," enthused a two-page review in Collier's: The National Weekly. The New York Times reported: "The people who saw it described it as being wonderful beyond words."

==== "A Wine of Wizardry" ====
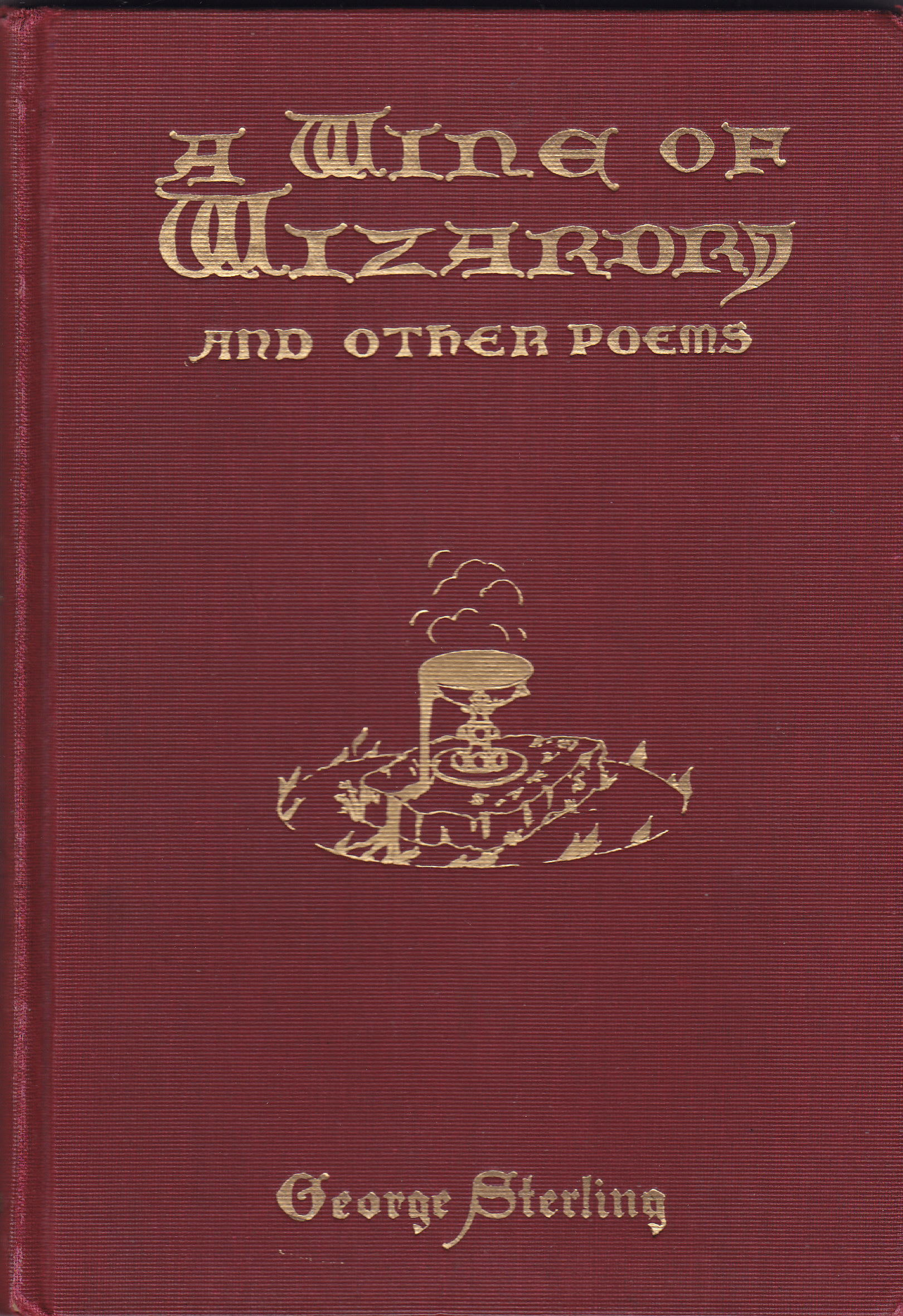
1909 A Wine of Wizardry and Other Poems by George Sterling, first edition first state

In January 1904, Sterling had sent Bierce another long poem, "A Wine of Wizardry". When Bierce read the poem, he thrilled: "And the poem! I hardly know how to speak of it. No poem in English of equal length has so bewildering a wealth of imagination. Not Spenser himself has flung such a profusion of pearls into so small a casket. Why, man, it takes away the breath!" When "A Wine of Wizardry" was first published in Cosmopolitan magazine in 1907 with an afterword by Bierce it stimulated a nationwide controversy. It was both critically praised and condemned. The poem was reprinted in Sterling's 1908 collection A Wine of Wizardry and Other Poems. It was reprinted again several times, and has been imitated and parodied by many writers. The poem inspired Clark Ashton Smith to become a poet and influenced other writers as well.

By late 1907, Sterling was notorious due to the "Wine of Wizardry" furor, so he found it easier to sell his verses to magazines. Leading national magazines such as The American Magazine, Bookman, Century Magazine, Current Literature, Literary Digest, and McClure's bought his poems. Dozens of newspapers reprinted his verses.

=== "More human" poems and first fiction, 1910–1916 ===
In 1910 and 1911, Sterling began to consciously evolve his style and subjects. "I'm trying to become somewhat more human [in poetry]!" he wrote to poet Witter Bynner, "It's not so easy as I had fifteen years' start [1896–1910] in the wrong direction."

==== The House of Orchids and Other Poems ====
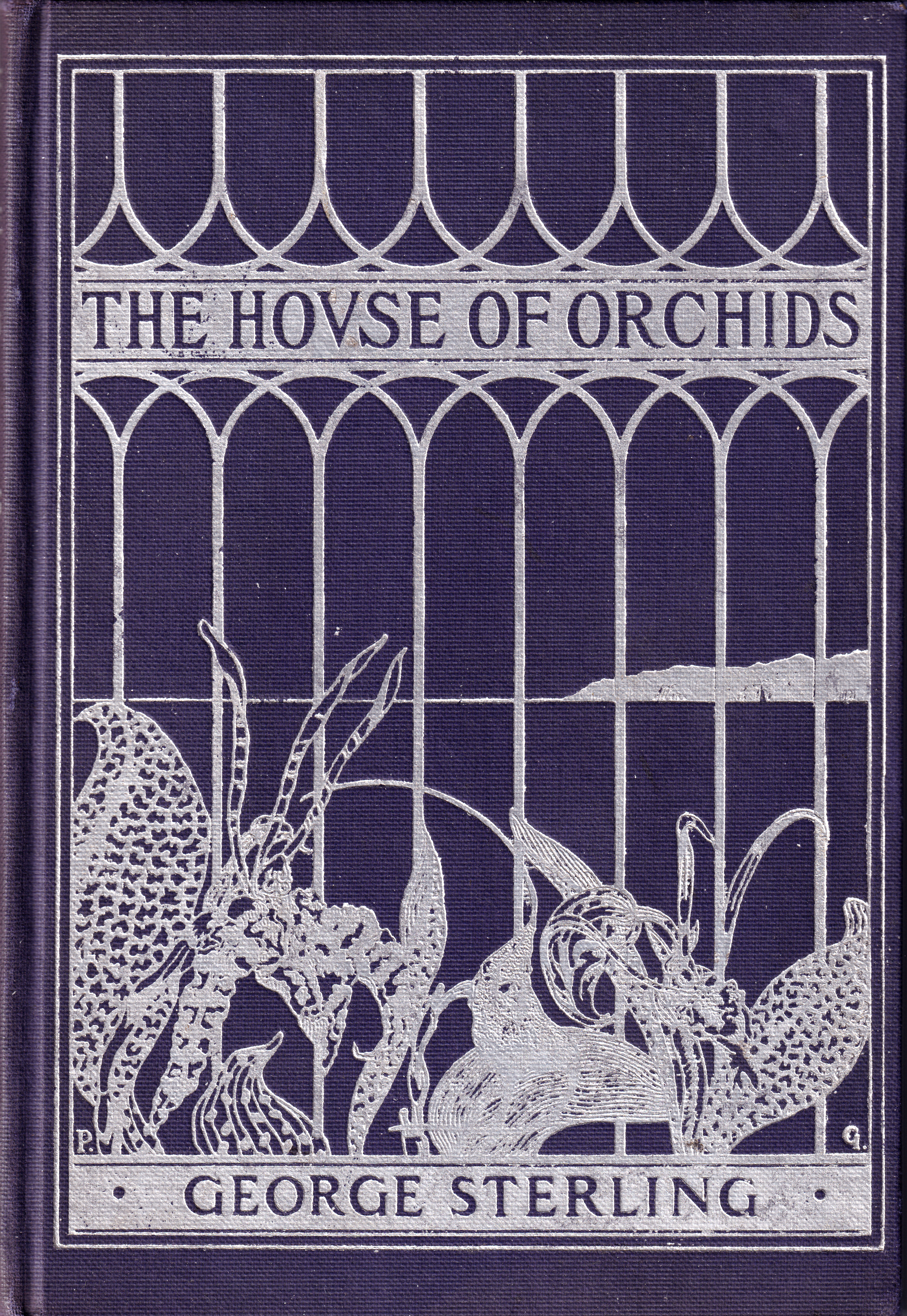
1911 The House of Orchids and Other Poems by George Sterling, cover art by Porter Garnett

In 1911, Alexander Robertson published Sterling's third collection of verses, The House of Orchids and Other Poems. It sold more copies than his prior two volumes, and also generated his best reviews to date. The New York Times said: "In his new book ... Mr. Sterling has added to his earlier unusual qualities of imagination and of expression the restraint needed to make them truly effective. ... One could quote from it an hundred lines of exceptional beauty. ... Mr. Bierce has been hailing Mr. Sterling for some years past as the greatest poet on this side of the Atlantic. Mr. Bierce's hail seems likely to be justified." The Los Angeles Times: "The undeniable merits of the majority of the poems in The House of Orchids make the book an important addition to America's modern poetic literature. Sterling has a rare perception of that thing which we call Beauty. And he possesses, also, the literary sense which results in that inevitable just-a-position of words which no amount of study can bring about, and which always distinguishes the genius from the philistine."

==== "The Black Vulture" ====
Sterling was (and is today) highly regarded for his sonnets. Literary historian S. T. Joshi stated: “If there were any justice in the world, Sterling would be hailed as perhaps the most proficient sonneteer in American literature.” "The Black Vulture", a sonnet from The House of Orchids, was cited by Thomas E. Benediktsson in his book George Sterling as "a sonnet which became Sterling's most consistently praised and most anthologized poem". Poet and critic William Rose Benét wrote: "As for 'The Black Vulture', I think it is one of the finest sonnets in the language." The New York Times said: "No finer sonnet has been written for many a day." In American Literature, professor Robert G. Berkelman called it "one of Sterling's most enduring achievements and certainly among the memorable sonnets in our literature". After the poem's first book publication in 1911, reprints of "The Black Vulture" in newspapers, magazines, and books have kept it almost continually in print for more than a hundred years.

==== 1912 and 1913 productivity ====
The years 1912 and 1913 saw a burst of productivity from Sterling. His poems appeared in national publications American Magazine, Bookman, Century, Current Opinion, Everybody's Magazine, Harper's Monthly, Hearst's International, North American Review, Saturday Evening Post, and other magazines, and were reprinted by The Washington Post and other newspapers across the country. In 1912 a nationwide contest had been announced, offering large cash prizes for what judges chose as the three best poems published in a newspaper or magazine during 1912 but not published in any book. Sterling submitted an ode to Robert Browning, and out of hundreds of poets who entered, won second place. He received a cash award of almost $8,000 in today's money. Even with many sales of his verses, Sterling was dissatisfied by how little money his poems earned. In January 1913 he began writing short fiction. "Finished my first short-story, 'Mr. Easton & the Dryad!'" he wrote in his diary.

Meanwhile, Sterling sold his poetry for the first time to the prestigious magazine The Smart Set, one of the most irreverent and influential literary magazines of its time. The Smart Set's prominence grew thanks to its two editors, H. L. Mencken and George Jean Nathan. Mencken, first as editor of Smart Set and later of American Mercury, became Sterling's best customer, buying more of his poetry and prose than any other editor. Mencken became much more than just a buyer to Sterling; the two men would be frequent pen pals, they would visit in person in New York and San Francisco, and Mencken would be indirectly involved in Sterling's suicide.

==== A Masque of the Cities ====
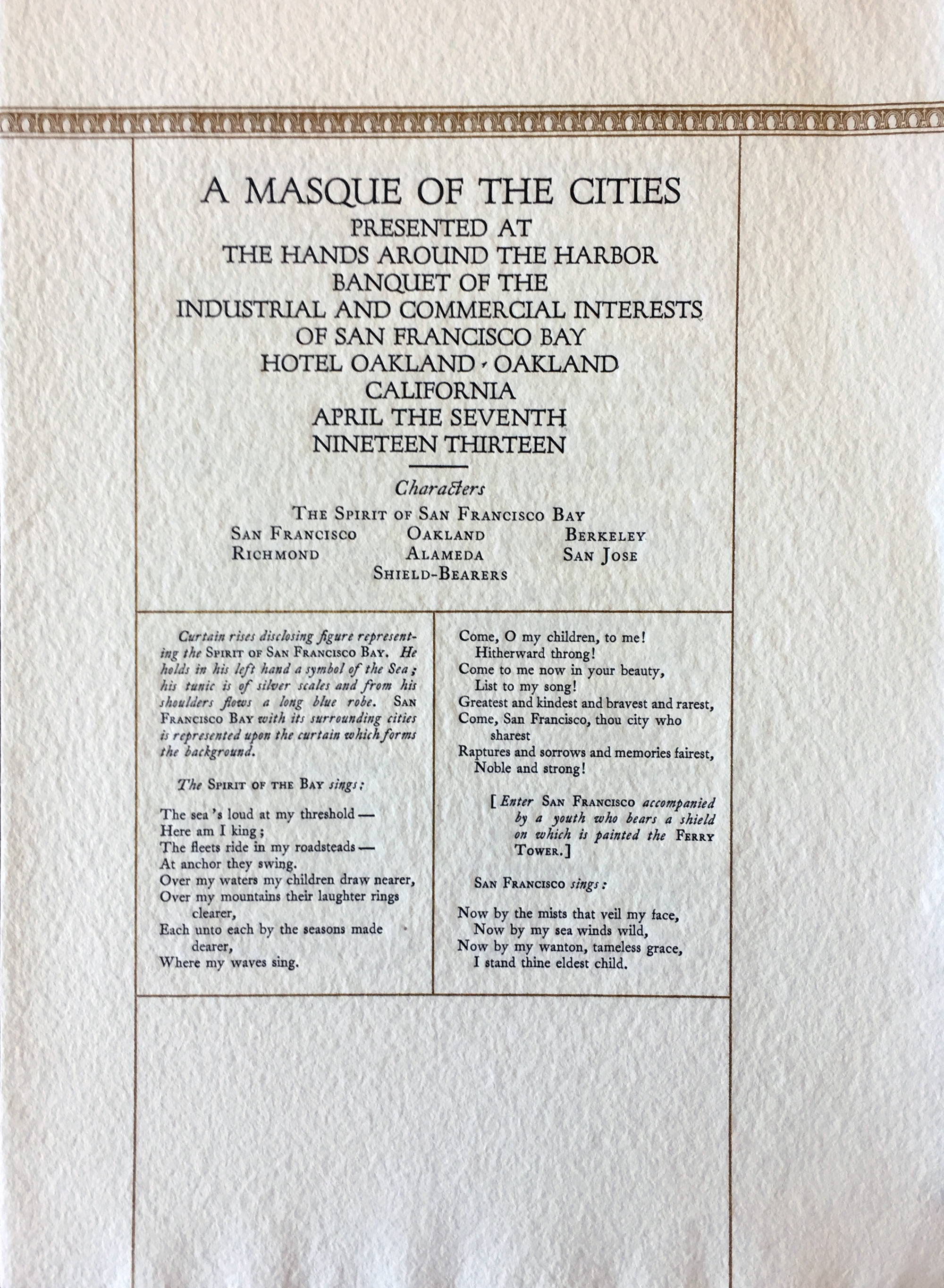
First printed edition of A Masque of the Cities, a play by George Sterling and Henry Anderson Lafler performed April 7, 1913

Harmon Bell, the founding president of the Oakland Commercial Club, conceived of a joint task force linking all industries and city governments around the entire San Francisco Bay to attract businesses to the Bay Area. Bell persuaded 400 leading businessmen and politicians from all major Bay Area cities to gather at a banquet announcing his new organization. He wanted the event to rouse and enthuse his attendees. Henry Anderson Lafler and George Sterling were hired to write an inspiring musical play. At Bell's banquet the night of April 7, 1913, their A Masque of the Cities was performed and by all accounts was a success. Newspapers gave glowing reviews. Four papers printed the play. A Masque of the Cities was also printed using handset type on handmade paper as a keepsake edition.

The next month, Sterling scored a quieter triumph. His poem "Willy Pitcher" appeared in the June issue of Atlantic Monthly, America's most prestigious magazine.

==== Babes in the Wood ====
Sterling wanted to write fiction about prehistoric people. He created two Stone-Age characters, a boy and a girl. He introduced them as 10-year-old cave kids, then worked them through a series of six stories as they grew into a young man and woman. "Their adventures are more interesting and better told than [Edgar Rice] Burroughs, and more believable, too. All are good", proclaimed Fantasy Commentator. Sterling spiced paragraphs with the rhythms and vividness of verse: "Then silence leaped in upon sound like water above a cast pebble, and the forest resumed its dream." He finished his six stories and mailed his prehistoric series to magazine publishers. Most turned down his cavekids tales. Sterling could sell them only to Popular Magazine, a pulp fiction "rag". The series title was Babes in the Wood. It was the only longer piece of fiction by Sterling ever published.

At the end of 1913, critic William Stanley Braithwaite named Sterling's "Night Sentries" one of the best poems of the year.

==== Move to New York City and Sag Harbor ====
Because Carrie Sterling divorced him, Sterling left Carmel, California on April 13, 1914 and moved to New York City. He hoped to sell poems and stories to New York publishers. He met a few friends in New York, but did not sell many poems or stories. On May 30, he moved to Sag Harbor, New York for the summer, writing either a thousand words of fiction or a complete poem every morning and swimming most afternoons. Writer James Hopper lined Sterling up with a literary agent to sell his fiction.

==== Beyond the Breakers and Other Poems ====
While Sterling visited Sag Harbor, Alexander Robertson published his newest book, Beyond the Breakers and Other Poems. The Los Angeles Times stated: "There is strength as well as grace in his verse, a richness of metaphor and simile, and seldom a weak line—never a careless one. His blank verse has no equal among his contemporaries." Poet Joyce Kilmer, in Literary Digest, decided: "By writing '[A] Wine of Wizardry' and 'The Black Vulture', George Sterling earned the gratitude of all lovers of poetry. And unlike most poets who suddenly become famous, he has steadily gained power. His new book, Beyond the Breakers and Other Poems, is better than any of the three distinguished volumes that preceded it." The New York Times differed: "Beyond the Breakers does not contain so much verse of unusual beauty as his previous volume, [The] House of Orchids, but it maintains a high average."

==== The Flight ====
In February 1914 Sterling had written a short play, The Flight, for Bay Area social club The Family to present in the summer. When the members of The Family club held their annual summer gathering, Sterling's The Flight, with music by Cass Downing, was a high point. "So enthusiastic were the clubmen over this little drama that they immediately wired to Sterling at Sag Harbor, Long Island, informing him in all sincerity that it was the most beautiful play that had ever been given in the club's history."

In autumn Sterling moved from Sag Harbor back to New York City with about 75 newly-written poems (most about the Great War) and fifteen stories. He sold a few to magazines, but only for low prices. In spite of Sterling knocking on New York editors' doors during 1914, the national magazines that bought his poems were mostly publications he'd already sold to in prior years. Sterling's lack of an established reputation with East Coast editors crippled his ability to sell to other magazines. His new year looked bleak in New York.

==== Return to San Francisco ====
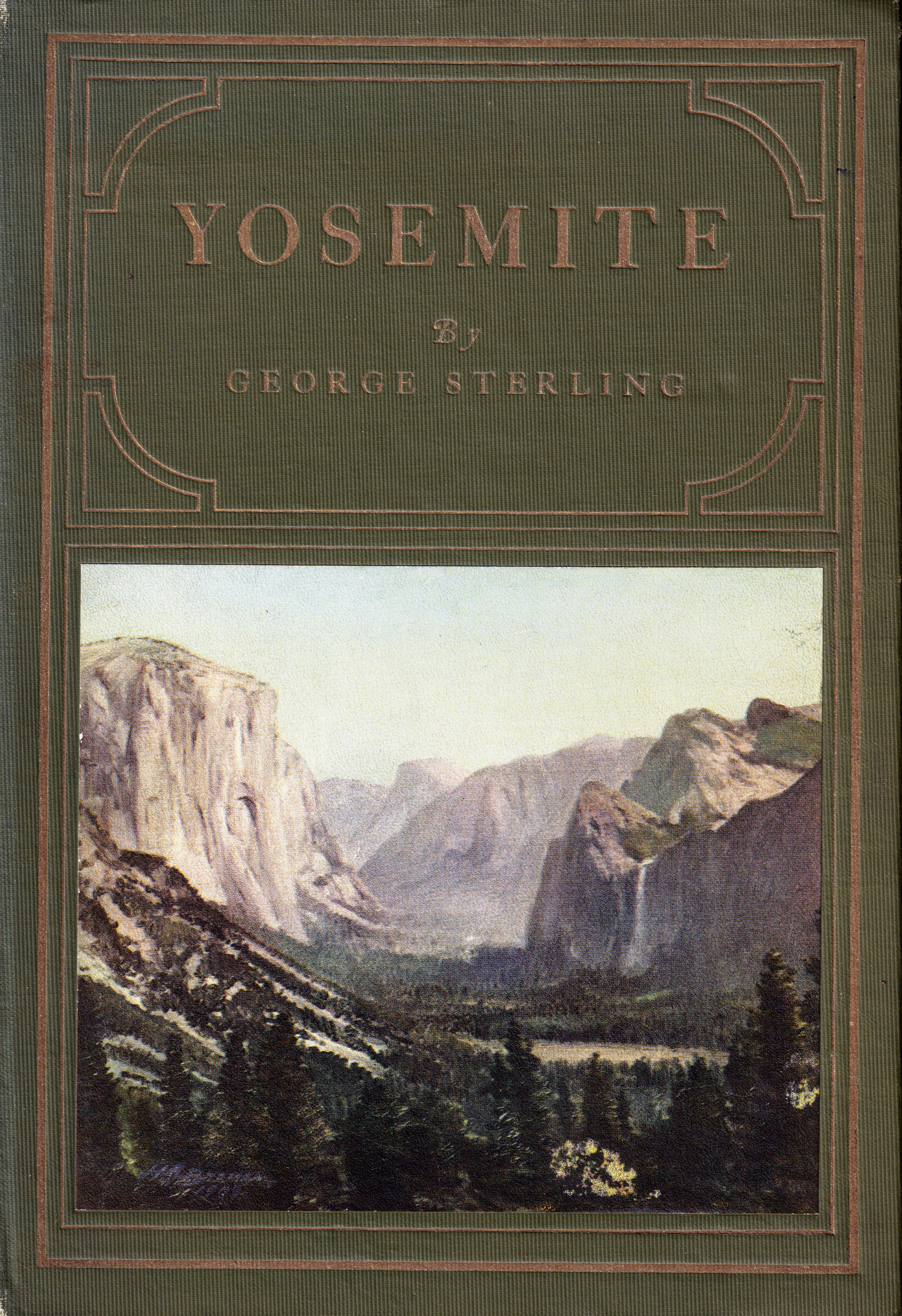
1916 Yosemite: An Ode by George Sterling

In San Francisco, however, the new year made most people feel eager. Their biggest anticipation was the 1915 World's Fair, which would be held in the city to celebrate both the Panama Canal's opening and San Francisco's recovery from the 1906 earthquake and fire. The Panama-Pacific International Exposition was scheduled to begin February 20, 1915. That January, the San Francisco Examiner commissioned Sterling to write an ode commemorating the opening of the exposition. Sterling's long poem was printed in the Examiner, read at the exposition's opening ceremony, excerpted by magazines and books, and in November, published by Alexander Robertson as a 525-copy hardcover limited edition on handmade paper. The Examiner paid Sterling the equivalent of $4,100 for his ode, more than he earned from his entire summer of work in New York. Sterling missed California and his family and friends there. On April 15, 1915, he left New York City to return to San Francisco, arriving May 1.

In July Sterling wrote a long poem about Yosemite National Park and sold it to the San Francisco Call and Post. In October, Alexander Robertson published Yosemite: An Ode as a book.

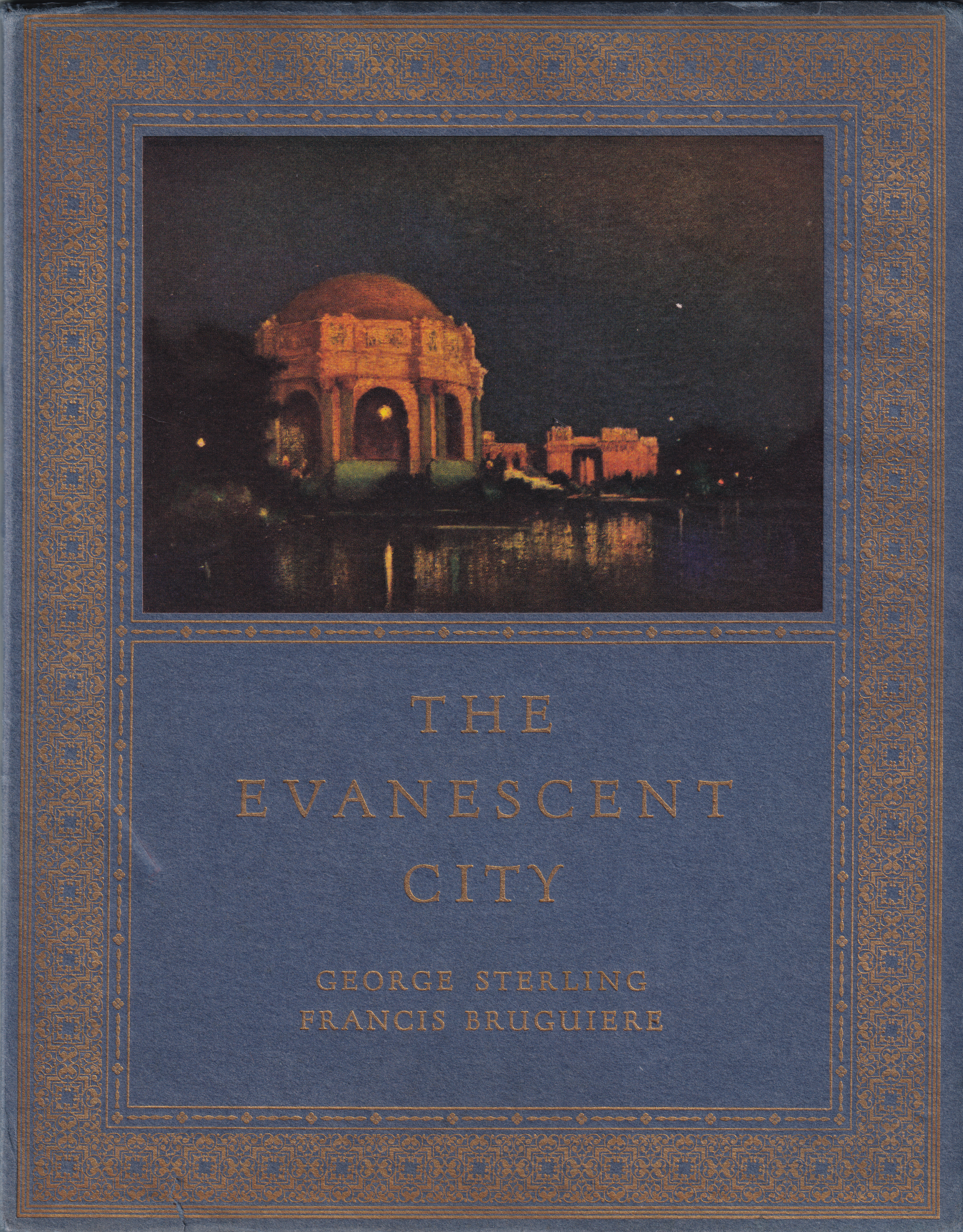
1916 The Evanescent City, George Sterling's best-selling book

That month Sterling wrote his second poem about the Panama-Pacific International Exposition. This time he described the beauty of the fair's buildings at sunset and reflected how such temporary glory will quickly fade. Sunset magazine printed his poem. Alexander Robertson rushed a book version into print in December, in time for the Exposition's last few days. The Evanescent City sold out its 4,000-copy first printing as well as a 1,000-copy second printing, one of the two best-selling volumes Sterling ever wrote. With Sterling focusing in 1915 on his Californian successes, he sold poems to only nine national magazines that year.

=== Playwright poet, 1916–1921 ===
==== The Caged Eagle and Other Poems ====
Sterling's fifth collection of poetry, The Caged Eagle and Other Poems, was published in July 1916 by A. M. Robertson. His new poetry collection was not reviewed as widely as his prior books. The most passionate review came from William Stanley Braithwaite in the Boston Evening Transcript: "However he may express himself in strictly conventionalized forms, they do not seem to impede the really immense scope of his imagination. ... it is of particular importance to note that his whole spiritual temper is made significant by the unusual quality this large power has upon his nature. I seem to feel this subtle sense of largeness, it may be spirit or vision or dream, in all that Mr. Sterling writes." Elsewhere in Boston, the Transcript's competitor the Boston Post was more matter-of-fact: "In The Caged Eagle and Other Poems, George Sterling, a deservedly well known California poet, is certain to gratify those who have had the good fortune to read his earlier volumes. And the 50 poems on the war, all but one of them sonnets, will insure him a welcome to many new readers, although they will not endear him to German-Americans." The most unexpected review of The Caged Eagle and Other Poems came from former U.S. president Theodore Roosevelt, who on July 14, excited by the book's pro-war poems, wrote a letter to Sterling beginning: "Three cheers for the unneutral sonnets!"

==== Magazine poetry and Songs ====
1916 was a good year for Sterling in terms of the quantity of national magazines publishing his poetry: Ainslee's, Art World, Bellman, Bookman, Collier's, Current Opinion, Harper's Monthly, Literary Digest, McClure's, Munsey's, Pearson's, Poetry Journal, even the staid Scribner's. The last days of 1916 saw a different kind of Sterling publication: a songbook Songs by George Sterling had music by Lawrence Zenda. Zenda was the pen name of Mrs. Rosaliene Reed Travis, one of Sterling's lovers.

==== The Play of Everyman ====
1917 Jan 5 Los Angeles Evening Express ad for world premiere of The Play of Everyman by George Sterling

When Songs was published, Sterling was in Los Angeles working on a play. The Play of Everyman is his adaptation of Austrian writer Hugo von Hofmannsthal's German play Jedermann. Lavish productions of Sterling's The Play of Everyman in 1917 and 1936 were acclaimed by critics and boosted the careers of people involved. Sterling's adaptation was also staged in 1941 in New York City.

==== The Binding of the Beast and Other War Verse ====
For months Sterling had called for the United States to join the Great War to support the Allies. Congress voted for the U.S. to enter World War I on April 6, 1917. Sterling joined a pro-war group of writers called the Vigilantes, pledging to write pieces to support Allied efforts. At Alexander Robertson's request, Sterling gathered 28 of his war poems for a new book, The Binding of the Beast and Other War Verse. It was published in time for Christmas 1917. Sterling warned Clark Ashton Smith: "My little book of war-verse is out ... it's verse and not poetry."

At the end of 1917, Sterling's poem "The Glass of Time", about reflections in a lake at Jack London's Beauty Ranch, was chosen one of the best poems of the year.

==== The Twilight of the Kings ====
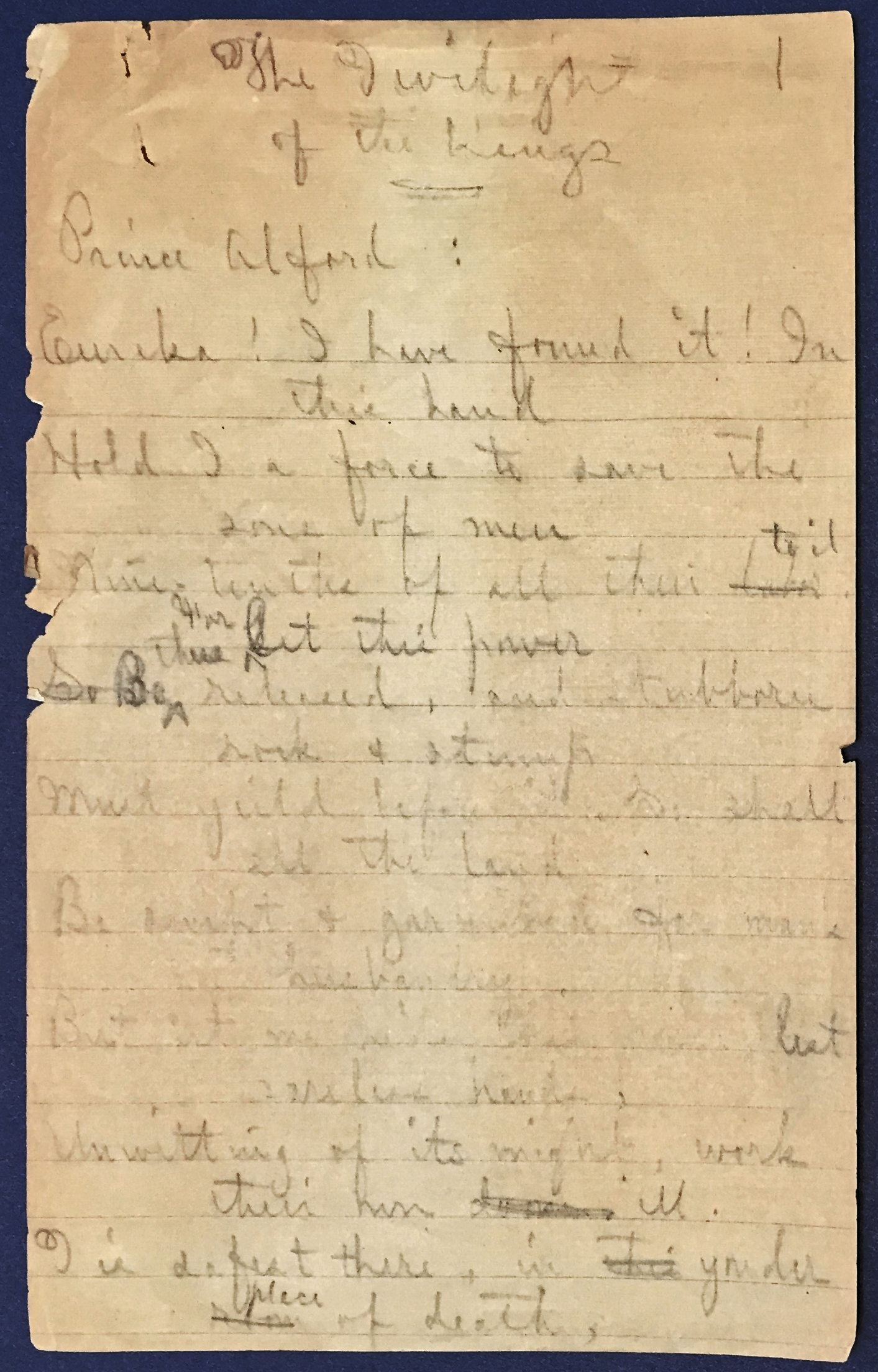
First page of George Sterling's pencil first draft of The Twilight of the Kings

Back in 1916, Bohemian Club managers had told Sterling they wanted him to write the Club's grove play for 1918. In early 1918 he finished the play's song lyrics. The name of Sterling's anti-dictatorship musical drama was The Twilight of the Kings (with Richard M. Hotaling and [uncredited] Porter Garnett; music by Wallace A. Sabin). It was a science fiction allegory of World War I, but set in medieval times, with a prince inventing the superweapon gunpowder and suffering its consequences. As with other Bohemian Club Jinks spectacles, the full play was performed only once, on August 3, 1918. The magazine Musical America called it "a play affording broadly laid out and well characterized scenes, and ... dignified and often impressive literary expression. The lyrics of the play ... are by that conjurer of the beautiful, George Sterling ... A 'Peace Song', sung by one of the princes in the play, recommended itself very particularly; it is one of the choicest moments of the work." Musical America's national competitor Musical Courier agreed "the play has much literary value. As to the dramatic side, it is in many passages splendid. ... This is a deeply impressive prophetic drama." The other national magazine for professional musicians, Musical Leader, concluded its review: "The sentiment expressed in the masque and its pictureful presentation made this one of the banner years in the history of the club." On August 15, The Twilight of the Kings was staged in a concert version in San Francisco, with actor Richard Hotaling narrating the action and reading dialog, and professional singers performing the songs. "Jerome Uhl [a bass-baritone with New York's Metropolitan Opera] made a tremendous hit performing the drinking song", reported Musical Courier. The audience stopped the performance with applause and cheering and made Uhl sing the song again.

==== Lilith ====
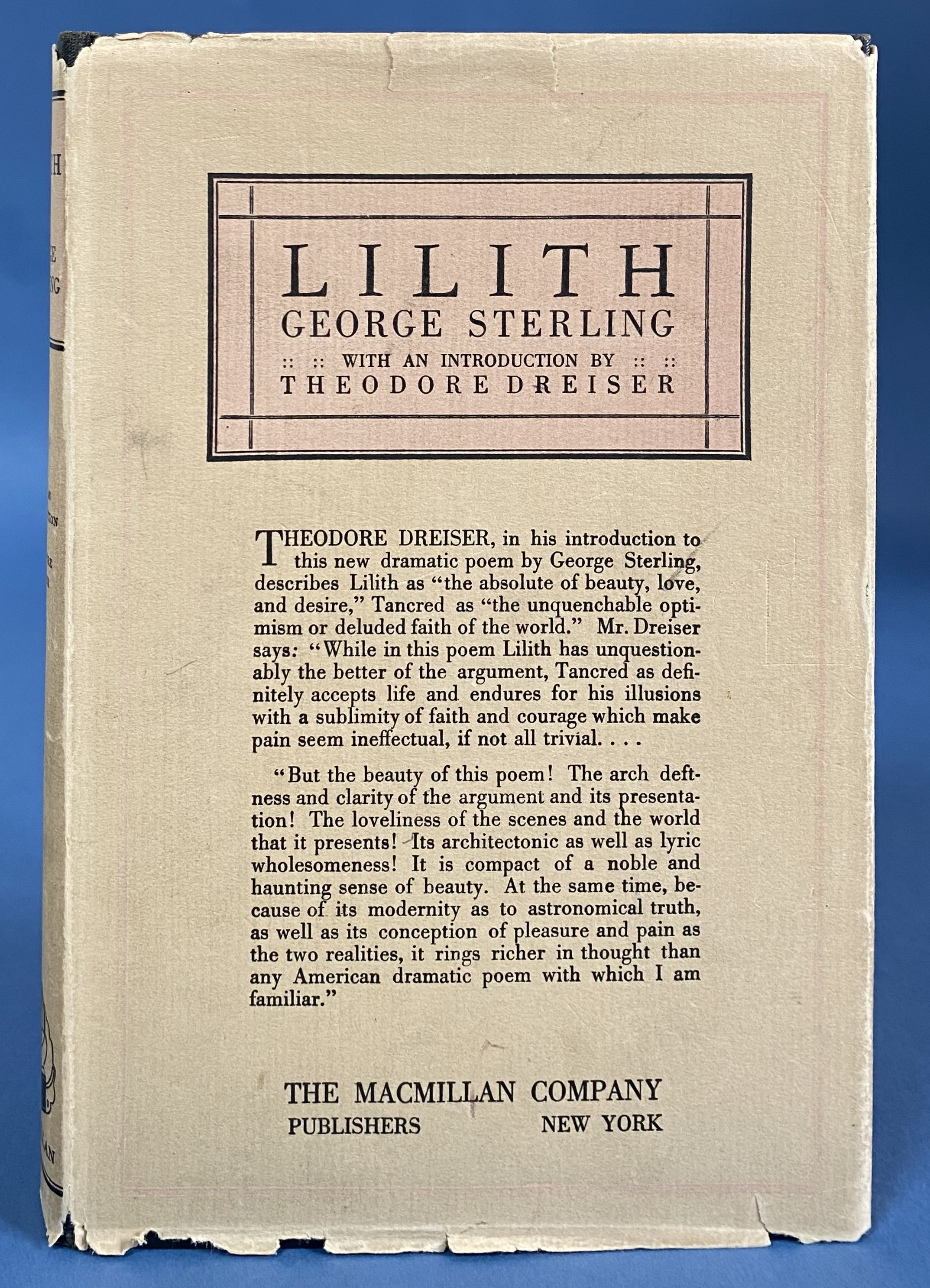
Dust jacket of 1926 edition of Lilith: A Dramatic Poem with quotation from Theodore Dreiser

Sterling wrote Lilith: A Dramatic Poem, a four-act fantasy verse drama from 1904 to 1918. The play was first published in 1919. Influential critic H. L. Mencken said of Sterling: "I think his dramatic poem Lilith was the greatest thing he ever wrote." The New York Times declared Lilith "the finest thing in poetic drama yet done in America and one of the finest poetic dramas yet written in English". Author Theodore Dreiser said: "It rings richer in thought than any American dramatic poem with which I am familiar." Poet Clark Ashton Smith wrote: "Lilith is certainly the best dramatic poem in English since the days of Swinburne and Browning. ... The lyrics interspersed throughout the drama are as beautiful as any by the Elizabethans." In his book George Sterling, Thomas E. Benediktsson stated: "The allegorical Lilith is undoubtedly Sterling's best poem."

==== Rosamund ====
On March 23, 1920, Sterling announced he had finished the first draft of a historical play, Rosamund. He finished the final draft on April 15, telling H. L. Mencken: "I've finished my dramatic poem, Rosamund. It contains one rape and four murders—quite Shakespearean." Sterling found Princess Rosamund's story in chapter 45 of The Decline and Fall of the Roman Empire by Edward Gibbons. In 567 A.D., Alboin, king of the Lombards, killed the Gepid king Cunimund. King Alboin raped Cunimund's daughter Princess Rosamund, then forced her to marry him and become his queen. In 572 A.D., Queen Rosamund avenged her father by assassinating her husband King Alboin. Sterling self-published 500 numbered, hand-signed copies of Rosamund: A Dramatic Poem. The Oakland Tribune summed it up: "The story of the princess who was thrown into a world of fighting and lustful men, who was most grievously wronged and who became thereafter an avenger who used her beauty and her love as her weapons, is one that is filled with intense dramatic possibility and as told by Sterling has a tremendous emotional appeal, a noble rhythm, and a tragic atmosphere comparable to that of Macbeth." After reading the play, Clark Ashton Smith wrote to Sterling: "My congratulations on Rosamund! As you warned me, it lacks the poetic beauty of Lilith; but nevertheless, it is a great drama. What action! It should make a tremendous 'film', if you don't mind my saying so; I don't mean that as a slam, in any sense."

==== "The Cool, Grey City of Love" ====
Outside of Rosamund, Sterling had little published in 1920. That year, just four national magazines printed his poems. However, a local newspaper poem was a hit. Sterling's "The Cool, Grey City of Love (San Francisco)", gave San Francisco its most popular nickname. The poem was reprinted many times, both in publications and as stand-alone collectables.

=== Simple, clear poems, 1921–1926 ===
As if to make up for his scant 1920 output, during 1921 Sterling placed 15 poems in seven national magazines. The poems he wrote in 1921 rarely used old-fashioned words such as "thee" or "thou" to sound "poetical" as many of his earlier poems did; instead, most of his new poems used only contemporary words. In June Sterling's poem To a Girl Dancing was published as a limited edition of 120 elegantly designed hardcover books by the Grabhorn Press, one of the most esteemed fine presses in America. That September Sterling accomplished an unusual literary feat: Charles Brennan, a defense attorney for movie star Roscoe "Fatty" Arbuckle's rape and murder trial, hired Sterling to "prepare the epigrams for the speech of defense".

==== Sails and Mirage and Other Poems ====
Alexander Robertson published Sterling's newest collection of poems in December 1921: Sails and Mirage and Other Poems. Of the 61 poems in this anthology, only 22 were new in 1921. The majority were older. Differences in Sterling's newer poems were noticed by some reviewers. The New York Tribune pointed out: "In Sails and Mirage, I believe, we have Sterling's choicest work; certainly his most keenly human. ... Sterling in the past was too prone, one feels, to hurl suns and meteors and satellites about his finely-chiseled Dantesque head. ... This gesture in the grand manner is in Sails and Mirage admirably subdued, and Sterling's genuine gift for lyricism ... issues forth with a pleasing klang for the sensitive ear and the active imagination." In the New York Evening Post, poet William Rose Benet remarked on the tenderness and wistfulness of the poems, different from Sterling's earlier echoes of Milton's "mighty line". Bookman, a leading publication for the book business, called Sterling's book "an uncanny, bitter, and very touching conflict between passionate longing for beauty and angry resentment at the ugliness of life". Sterling himself thought he still had a way to go to make his poems feel modern. Of Sails and Mirage and Other Poems, he said: "It's my best book, but almost as mid-Victorian as the others!"

==== The Letters of Ambrose Bierce ====
Sterling's two major literary accomplishments of 1922 were both editorial projects. He began work on the first project in January, a book for the Book Club of California: The Letters of Ambrose Bierce. He selected the book's contents. He reviewed each letter and deleted unfavorable references to living people and passages he felt made Bierce look bad. He helped the Book Club's secretary, Bertha Clark Pope write an introduction, and himself wrote "A Memoir of Ambrose Bierce" for the book. Sterling proofread the galleys and the printer's proofs, keeping involved through September. Sterling often gave credit for his own work to someone else, and here gave Bertha Pope sole credit as editor, keeping his name only as author of "A Memoir". H. L. Mencken reviewed the book' in Smart Set as "the most important contribution to Bierceiana made since Bierce's death. The letters are well selected, and Sterling's memoir and Mrs. Pope's introduction are very well turned out." Thirty-six years later, historian David Magee called The Letters of Ambrose Bierce "A most ambitious project and, aside from Cowan's Bibliography [of the History of California and the Pacific West], the most important publication in the [Book] Club's first decade."

==== Selected Poems ====
Sterling's second 1922 editorial project was his own book, Selected Poems. New York publisher Henry Holt and Company told Sterling the company wanted to publish a collection of Sterling's poetry. He went through five of his earlier books and selected 56 poems. He made more than a hundred changes to the texts of the poems. Many were modernizations; he changed "thy" to "your", "thine" to "yours", "thou art" to "you are", and "hath" to "had" or "has". Critic Harriet Monroe had complained Sterling's use of "deems" was "the frippery of a by-gone fashion". Sterling now replaced "deems" with "thinks" or "dreams". These changes echo the contemporary vocabulary of Sterling's new poems, and the advice he currently gave his protégés, such as telling poet Clark Ashton Smith to avoid the word "enfraught" because it "seems too artificial", and to revise a phrase because it "sounds forced, obscure, and unnatural". Sterling sent Henry Holt and Company the manuscript of Selected Poems in May.

During 1922, Sterling's poem "Pumas" attracted notable responses. "Pumas" was first published in the New York Evening Post Literary Review, then reprinted in the national magazine Literary Digest, (which said: "Sterling is California's leading poet, and judged by this his leadership extends much wider"), next reprinted in another national magazine, and finally selected by an anthology editor as one of the best poems of the year.

The Order of Bookfellows, a Chicago-based national organization of 3,000 booklovers and authors, announced April 28, 1923 Sterling's sonnet "Shelley at Spezia" had won the association's Kemnitz Prize for the best poem of the year.

The next month Sterling's Selected Poems was published. It contained mostly his older poems. Reviews were mixed. The New York Times said Selected Poems "contains a deal of beautiful albeit classical work. Some of it, to be sure, is on the cosmic order, but even here when Mr. Sterling is good he is very, very good. ... Mr. Sterling is particularly successful in the sonnet form and one has only to note 'The Dust Dethroned' (which fairly claims consideration with Shelley's 'Ozymandias') and 'The Black Vulture' to see how surely the poet handles this difficult form. His poems in regular forms often touch a real beauty, but the book taken as a whole fails really to stir the reader. Perhaps one reason for this is that Mr. Sterling is rather out of touch with his time." Outlook magazine disagreed: "It is poetry 'in the grand manner', concerned with life and death and destiny and the mystery of the universe. ... In profuse imagination and profound music George Sterling's poetry is always richly endowed, and his followers will find in this volume poems that have won a place for themselves with these qualities." The New York Evening Post decided: "he sings best of the sea and of the stars. 'Beyond the Breakers' is a swimmer's poem as thrilling as one of Swinburne's. 'Aldebaran at Dusk' is wholly beautiful." In Ontario, Canada, the Border Cities Star said: "Only a few of these poems are excellent, but they alone, by their compression, form, and harmony, justify the collection." Poet John Gould Fletcher wrote a long negative review in Freeman magazine: "Mr. Sterling, at his best in certain sonnets, and in his overpretentious "Testimony of the Suns", is about as good as de Heredia or Fitzgerald: that is to say, a minor Frenchman or a minor Englishman. At his worst, in "A Wine of Wizardry", he is sheer drivel: "Endymion" or "The Witch of Atlas" gone to pieces." Fletcher concluded that what "Keats saw, Mr. Sterling can not see, and therefore he has remained purblind—a versifier lavishing his craft on subjects beneath the dignity of a true poet." Poetry: A Magazine of Verse ran a one-sentence dismissal ending: "his talent has been overshadowed by latecomers".

By June 1923 Sterling was working on a third editing project: The Book Club of California recruited him to join poets Genevieve Taggard and James Rorty to collect an anthology of poems from California's best living poets. Work on the anthology would occupy Sterling's time for more than a year.

==== Truth (first version) ====
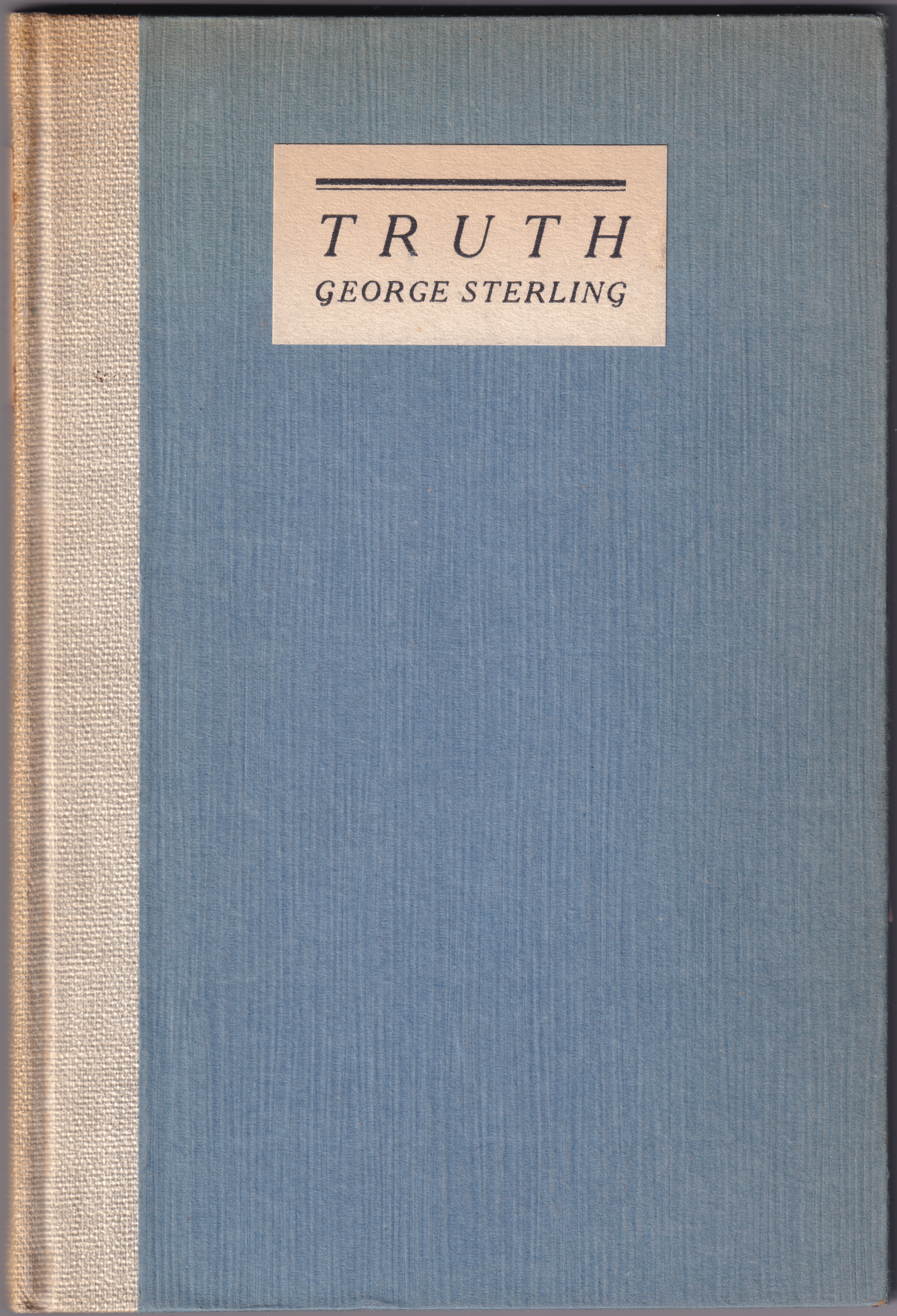
December 1923 first edition of play Truth by George Sterling, published by Order of Bookfellows, Chicago

Sterling wrote Truth, a verse drama telling a fantasy set in the imaginary medieval city of Vae, in 1921 and 1922. Chicago-based Order of Bookfellows published Truth in 1923. Half a century later literary historian Thomas E. Benediktsson ranked Truth as "one of Sterling's finest works".

Sterling's two poems "The Fog-Sea" and "The Young Witch – 1698" were both selected to appear in The Best Poems of 1923.

==== The Thief of Bagdad ====
Sterling began 1924 in Hollywood, working on a project for movie star Douglas Fairbanks, who produced his own movies. In those days movies were silent, so words spoken by characters were conveyed to audiences by titles on the screen. Fairbanks was producing and starring in the spectacular action-fantasy The Thief of Bagdad, and wanted Sterling to write more than 200 titles for the three-hour film. "I get $25. a day [about $750 a day in today's dollars] and my fare to and from S.F. Not bad for a poor poet", crowed Sterling. "I have luncheon 'on the lot' daily with Fairbanks and his wife (Mary Pickford)", then the world's most popular movie actress. Sterling also signed a contract with Fairbanks' company to create a book of songs about The Thief of Bagdad, to be sold in movie theaters showing the movie. Sterling wrote lyrics (telling a newspaper reporter "the public likes them mushy") and composer Mortimer Wilson wrote music, but no songbooks were printed.

Afterwards Sterling returned to work on the Book Club of California's poetry anthology. Among other tasks, he wrote an introduction, "From One Foothill", his defense of what he loved about poetry.

In 1924, fourteen Sterling poems were published in eleven national magazines. In addition, his poems were published in dozens of newspapers. That year Sterling's poem "The Flight" was named best narrative poem of the past year by Lyric West magazine, which awarded Sterling a cash prize of $100 (about $3,000 in today's money).

In 1925, the Book Club of California published Continent's End: An Anthology of Contemporary California Poets, which Sterling had edited with Genevieve Taggard and James Rorty. Thirty-three years later, historian David Magee wrote: "Continent's End is a real contribution to California literature. It represents the best of the younger poets of the day, such as Robinson Jeffers, who might not otherwise have found a hearing for their poems." That year Sterling became poetry editor, book reviewer, and columnist for the magazine Overland Monthly. He used his position to promote several younger poets, beginning his first monthly column by praising Jeffers and Clark Ashton Smith.

==== "The Pathfinders" ====
During 1925 Sterling had more than 25 new poems published, seventeen of them in fourteen national magazines. One key poem Sterling wrote in 1925 was not published until 1926. He spent months writing his long poem "The Pathfinders" in free verse—an unusual choice for Sterling, who had hated free verse poetry until he read and loved Robinson Jeffers' free verse. Sterling sent "The Pathfinders" to H. L. Mencken, writing: "This is probably the best thing I ever wrote, and I'm sending it to you first, hoping you'll like it." Mencken responded enthusiastically: "I think you are quite right. 'The Pathfinders' is an eloquent and excellent piece of writing and I shall put it into type at once." When American Mercury published the poem, Sterling received a letter from Edgar Lee Masters, who after the publication of his best-selling book Spoon River Anthology had become one of America's best-known poets. Masters said: "Last night I got a Mercury and read your poem 'The Pathfinders'. It is superb. It is a great symphony. ... Such lines as these are of imagination all compact ... The last line is a peak. I congratulate you most heartily."

==== Truth (second version) ====
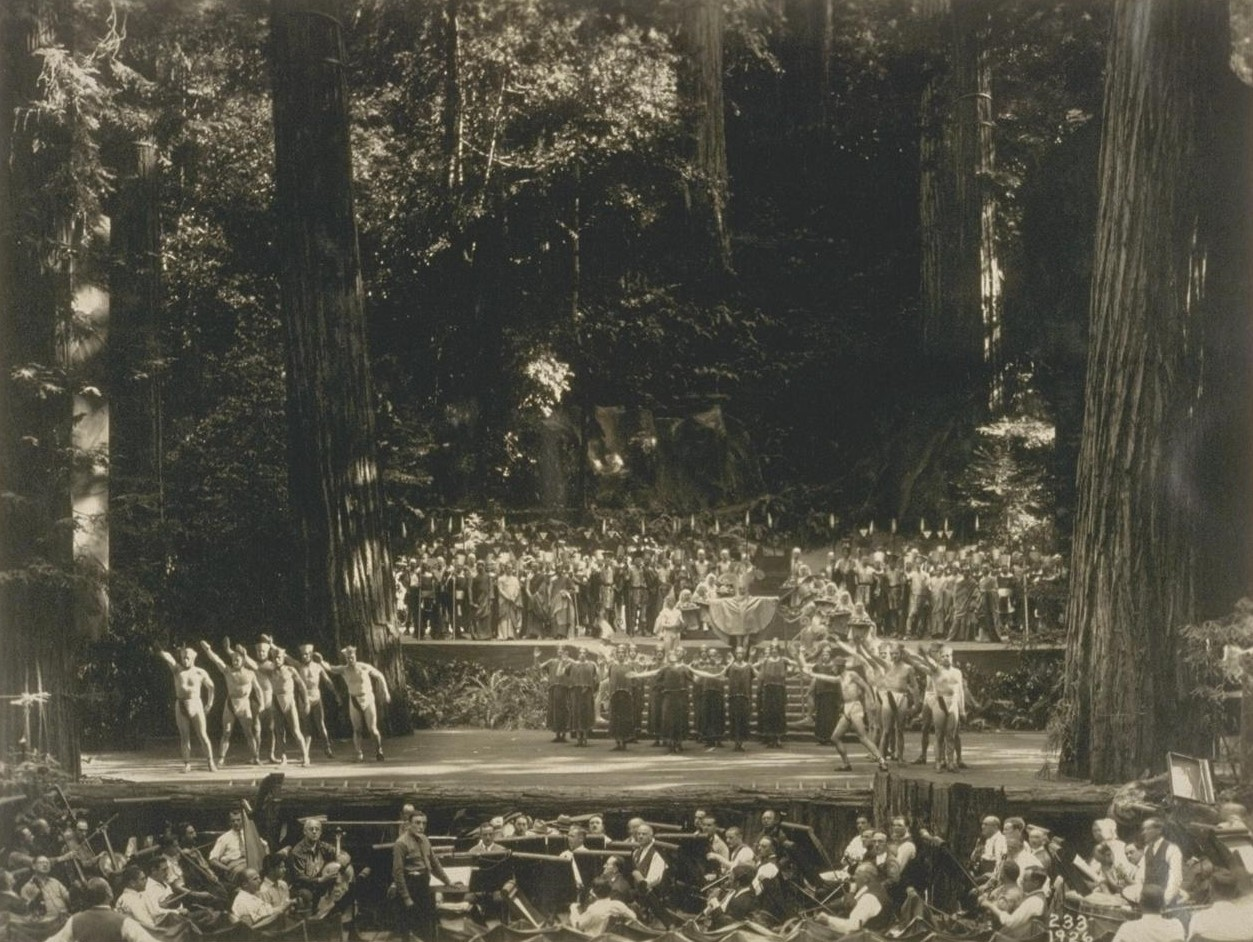
July 1926 Bohemian Grove rehearsal of Truth by George Sterling, act 2, scene 2: King Ducorial's court. Photo by Gabriel Moulin.

Sterling's biggest production in 1926 was a play. He completely rewrote his 1923 play Truth, transforming it into the Bohemian Club's summer 1926 stage spectacle. Its cast of 173 actors and extras, 27 dancers, and a choir of about thirty boy singers from Grace Cathedral, filled Bohemian Grove's mammoth stage. 58 San Francisco Symphony musicians performed music written and conducted by Domenico Brescia.

=== Posthumously published works ===
When Sterling died November 17, 1926, he left behind many uncollected or unpublished works: dozens of essays, "seventy-odd short stories", and hundreds of poems most readers had never seen.

==== Robinson Jeffers ====
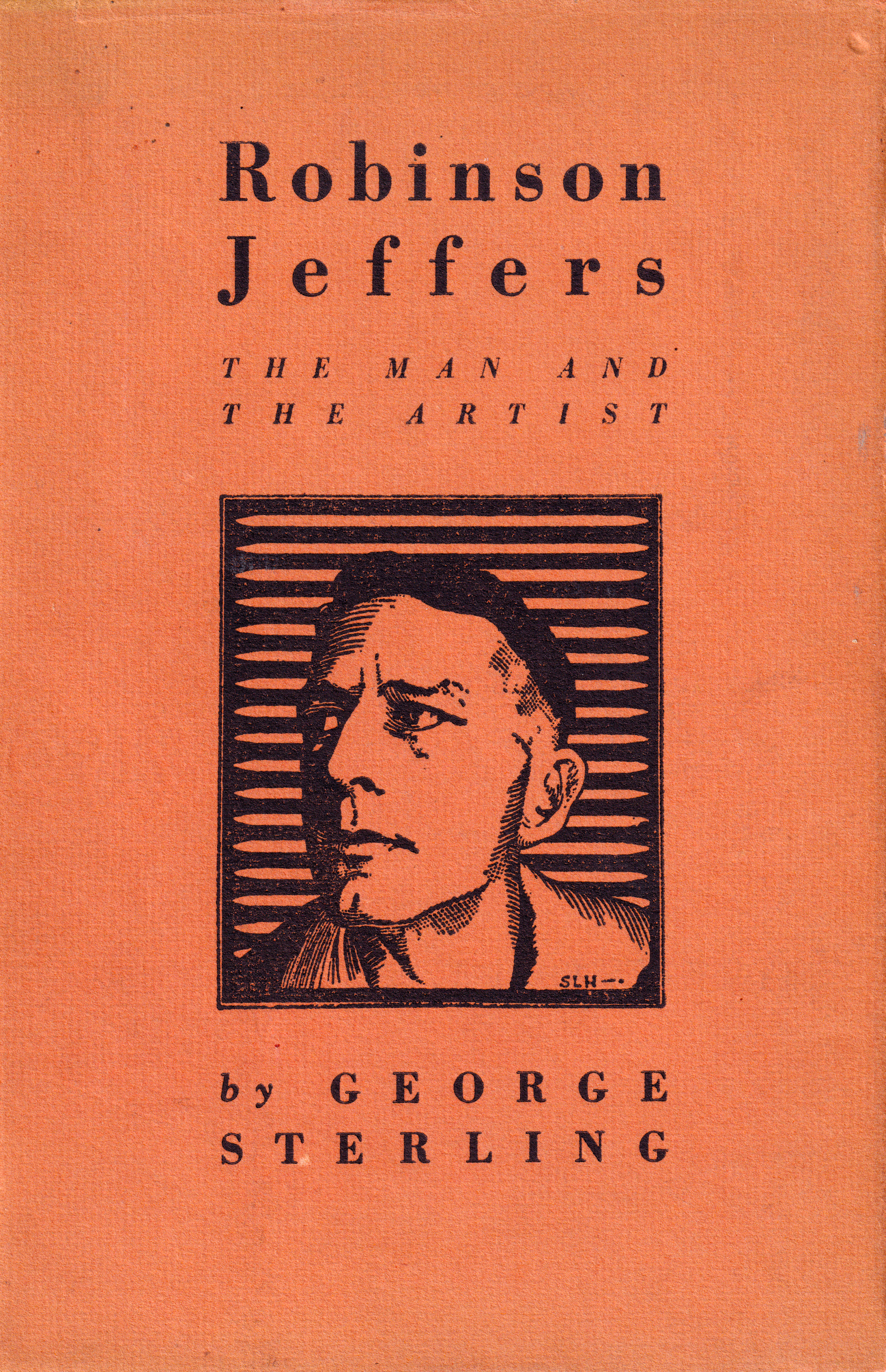
1926 book Robinson Jeffers: The Man and the Artist by George Sterling

Sterling's first posthumous book was at the publishers when he died. Knopf published Sterling's Robinson Jeffers: The Man and the Artist—the first book about poet Jeffers—in December, 1926, days after Sterling's death. The Occidental College Library's online exhibit on Jeffers says: "George Sterling's book launched Jeffers career as a popular poet. This book represented the passing of the unofficial position of California's leading poet from Sterling to the young Jeffers."

==== Sonnets to Craig, Songs (posthumous edition), Poems to Vera ====
Two years later, author Upton Sinclair published Sonnets to Craig, a collection of 102 poems Sterling had written in 1911–1912 to Sinclair's wife, the writer Mary Craig Sinclair. That same year 1928, a new edition of Songs by Sterling and with music by "Lawrence Zenda" (the pseudonym of Sterling's lover Mrs. Rosaliene Reed Travis) was published with five songs with lyrics by Sterling not in the prior two editions of Songs. Ten years after that, in 1938, Oxford University Press published Poems to Vera, 24 poems Sterling had written in 1910 to Vera Connolly, his young lover in Carmel who later became a "crusading journalist—a stirrer-upper".

==== After Sunset ====
The next year R. H. Barlow gathered 43 of Sterling's uncollected poems in the anthology After Sunset. All but three of those poems were written from 1921 through 1926, making After Sunset even now 85 years later the only Sterling collection focused on the more modern poems Sterling wrote in his final years. Because After Sunset was published in a tiny quantity by a bookstore lacking resources to publicize the book, few scholars were aware of it. Therefore, literary critics focused on Sterling's earlier volumes, unconscious of most writings from Sterling's prolific last six years. Thomas Benediktsson, for his 1980 book George Sterling, did read After Sunset, but mistakenly assumed that that 43-poem collection contained Sterling's entire "body of uncollected verse", unaware of more than five hundred additional uncollected poems written by Sterling.

==== Complete Poetry ====
The most important posthumous Sterling publication has been the 2013 three-volume set Complete Poetry, edited by S. T. Joshi and David E. Schultz. The first two volumes present the contents of eleven volumes of Sterling's poems and six verse dramas, plus notes about almost every poem. The third volume gathers 578 Sterling poems never published in a book before. Despite its title, Complete Poetry does not include all of Sterling's verse compositions.

==== Letters ====
Sterling was a prolific and entertaining letter writer. Volumes of letters published to date include the Sterling-H. L Mencken correspondence, the Sterling-Clark Ashton Smith correspondence, and Sterling's letters to his mentor Ambrose Bierce.

== Life and business career ==
=== Sag Harbor, New York; Ellicott City, Maryland; and New York City: 1869–1890 ===
George Augustine Sterling III was born December 1, 1869 in Sag Harbor on Long Island, New York. His father, Dr. George Augustine Sterling, Junior, M.D. (1843–1897), was a prosperous, deeply religious physician, the son of an Episcopal minister. The new mother, Mrs. Mary Havens Sterling (1845–1920), was the daughter of Captain Wickham Sayer Havens (1806–1880), a legendary whaler who retired rich and became a banker.

George III was the first of nine Sterling children. His best friend was Roosevelt "Roose" Johnson. Both were athletes—stronger than other boys—and passionate readers. George and Roose led a gang of Sag Harbor boys who called themselves the Night Hawks.

In 1886, George's father shocked his Episcopal friends by converting to Roman Catholicism. Dr. Sterling wanted his three sons to become Roman Catholic priests, beginning with his oldest. High school graduate George agreed to enter a six-year seminary program at St. Charles College in Maryland. Sterling first seriously studied poetry there when he took an English composition and grammar class taught by Father John Bannister Tabb, a well-known poet. After three years of earning prizes as one of St. Charles' top students, Sterling decided not to become a priest and dropped out when the school year ended in summer 1889.

In March 1890, his mother's brother Frank C. Havens visited Sag Harbor to see his ailing mother Sarah Havens, George's grandmother. Frank had left Sag Harbor as a boy and roamed the world, ending in San Francisco. There he founded the American Investment Union, its subsidiary the Home Accident Insurance Company of San Francisco, and other corporations. Frank Havens' growing companies needed trustworthy, intelligent employees. His nephew impressed him. Frank offered George an entry-level job, with a chance to work his way up, and gave George a first-class train ticket to Oakland. Sarah Havens died September 22. After her funeral, George took a train to California.

=== Oakland, California: 1890–1898 ===
Twenty-year-old George Sterling arrived in Oakland, California the night of September 30, 1890. He moved into his uncle Frank's estate near Oakland, Rosecrest, surrounded by the largest rose gardens in the west. Frank's four sons lived there; their mother had died four years earlier. "I arrived here at 8 o'clock one fine September evening", Sterling later recalled, "and by 9 o'clock the next morning I was at work in the First National Bank building. It was my first job, and the first 'real money' I ever made." He started as a bank clerk. He worked his way up to bookkeeper in Havens' headquarters on Sansome Street in San Francisco by the summer of 1891.

That year Sterling's Sag Harbor friend Roosevelt Johnson persuaded his father to pay for a train ticket to join Sterling in California. While they lived in Sag Harbor, both men had admired the poems of Californian Joaquin Miller. Now Johnson persuaded Sterling to visit Miller's nearby hilltop estate. There they met the elderly Miller and two young men, Carleton Bierce and Richard Partington, a British painter of portraits and landscapes. Sterling, Bierce, and Partington would remain friends for the rest of Sterling's life, and Sterling would grow closer to Partington's large family than any other except his own Sterling-Havens relatives. In the summer of 1892, on a campout at Lake Temescal Carleton Bierce introduced Sterling to Carleton's uncle Ambrose Bierce, who four years later would change Sterling's life.

In May 1895, Sterling began the cash book for Frank Havens' new Real Estate Combine. At its first board meeting on June 4, stockholders (Havens owned all but seven shares) elected Sterling as the new corporation's Secretary-Treasurer and as a member of its board of directors.

On Sept. 5, 1895, Frank Havens incorporated a master holding company, the Realty Syndicate. The Syndicate was two-thirds owned by Francis Marion Smith and one-third by Havens, but Havens was president and ran the new corporation. George Sterling was one of the Realty Syndicate's seven founding directors. The plan was for their new enterprise to build roads and public transit to the thousands of acres of raw land Havens, Smith, and their companies already owned, then sell tracts both to the public and to subdivision developers. The Realty Syndicate could provide financing to the developers to buy the land, and then finance their buyers' development: building the streets, sidewalks, streetcar lines, electricity lines, water mains, sewers, and houses to create saleable neighborhoods. It would also finance individual homebuyers' purchases of finished houses, and provide loans to any would-be-homeowner who bought a one-house lot if they wanted to build a home of their own. Sometimes the Realty Syndicate would develop subdivision neighborhoods itself, either selling ready-to-build lots or building homes on them. But the Syndicate's main goals were to sell large tracts of land and to finance those purchases—all on a massive scale.

On February 7, 1896, Sterling married his private stenographer, Caroline "Carrie" Eugenie Rand. The bride's matron of honor was Richard Partington's little sister' Katie Partington Peterson, and the groom's best man was her husband, Fred Peterson. The newlyweds moved into a rented house at 1081 East 23rd Street in Oakland. Sterling's father was seriously ill. Dr. Sterling sold his family home in Sag Harbor to Frank Havens and moved cross-country with George's mother and six sisters into Havens' Rosecrest estate.

For weeks in 1897, George, his mother, and his six sisters watched his father writhe and scream in agony despite opiate painkillers. March 8, 1897, fifteen days after George's first poem was published, he was in his father's bedroom at Rosecrest while the doctor died from a "stomach disorder", actually stomach cancer or an ulcerated stomach or both problems together. The effect of seeing his father tortured by intense, long-lasting physical pain—and the emotional agony suffered by his sisters and especially his mother—scarred George for life.

After Dr. Sterling died, his widow Mary (Frank Havens' sister) and her six daughters still lived at Havens' Rosecrest estate. Havens hired architect-builder W. Kirk to create a seven-room colonial-style home for them on a lot Havens owned in the unincorporated Piedmont Heights district. He would own the house, but Mary and her girls could live there rent-free.

As soon as her new home was built, Mrs. Mary Havens Sterling and the six Sterling sisters moved out of Frank Havens' Rosecrest estate and into their new home in Piedmont at 2083 Oakland Avenue. They weren't the only ones who moved from Rosecrest to Piedmont: In November, Havens sold his Rosecrest estate and moved to Piedmont.

=== Piedmont, California: 1898–1905 ===
In 1898, George and Carrie moved from Oakland to Piedmont to be closer to his mother and sisters. First the couple moved in with Frank and Lila Havens, four blocks from Mary Sterling and her daughters. Then George and Carrie rented a house even closer, at 2010 Oakland Avenue, across the street from the Sterling women. Before May 10, 1901, George and Carrie bought their Piedmont home from their landlord. They were now homeowners.

In 1901 Sterling's first major poem was published in The Washington Post and he met struggling writer Jack London, who became his best friend. When London met him, Sterling was the corporate secretary of both the Real Estate Combine and the Piedmont Development Company, the auditor of the Realty Syndicate, and a member of the boards of directors of the Realty Syndicate, the Oakland Transit Company and other corporations. London couldn't make enough money to pay his rent in cash, so he squeezed himself, his wife, and their baby daughter into a friend's small house in a poor section of Oakland where instead of paying rent they provided meals.

Sterling found a house for London and his wife Bess at below-market rent. "Have a great view, now", London enthused, "a clean sweep of the horizon—San Francisco across the bay, Goat, Angel, and Alcatraz islands, the Golden Gate and the Pacific to say nothing of the Contra Costa and Berkeley hills. Writing has not been up to much lately, but I should surely do good work here." The Londons' new home at 56 Bayo Vista Avenue was only 1.3 miles from the Sterlings' house. In February 1902, Sterling found a bigger place for the Londons on Blair Avenue in Piedmont, even closer to the Sterling home. Sterling and London became the center of "The Crowd", a group of writers, artists, and musicians in Oakland, Berkeley, and Piedmont.

In early 1903, Sterling was appointed vice president of the Real Estate Combine. Jack London finished a draft version of a new novel, and impressed by Sterling's writing abilities, asked him to suggest improvements. London accepted most of Sterling's suggestions, but the two men "had arguments over one or two words". The Macmillan Company published London's The Call of the Wild in July. It was a huge international bestseller. London inscribed a copy of his novel to Sterling: "From one who has felt for you sharper pangs of comradeship than any other man."

Tuesday, December 22, a new startup, the Piedmont Building Association, filed articles of incorporation with the Alameda County clerk. Sterling was one of five founding directors. Also that year Sterling self-published his first book, The Testimony of the Suns and Other Poems, which generated nationwide acclaim. He inscribed a copy: "To our genius, Jack London. Here's my book, my heart you have already."

In 1904 Sterling was named the Real Estate Combine's chairman of the board. He was invited to join the Bohemian Club and worked to have the club admit Jack London as an honorary member. As the new year of 1904 began, London was frantically trying to finish a new novel, The Sea-Wolf. William Randolph Hearst's national chain of newspapers offered to pay London to travel to Japan, Korea, and China to report on the Russo-Japanese War, but only if London left the night of January 7. In the last hours before he boarded a ship, London finished a Sea-Wolf draft he considered good enough for magazine publication. Those editors always deleted paragraphs and changed texts, so London wouldn't polish that draft. The book text he cared about very much, but he would be on the other side of the world, unable to work on it. London turned over his magazine draft to Sterling and London's lover Charmian Kittredge, trusting them to combine that draft with London's notes, any corrections spotted by the magazine editors, and Sterling's and Kittredge's own improvements to produce The Sea-Wolf book version while London was in Asia.

In October The Sea-Wolf was published. It became London's second worldwide bestseller. Sterling's contributions to the book version so impressed London that he gifted Sterling with The Sea-Wolf's original typescript. Afterwards London sent prepublication drafts of other books and stories to Sterling, "his best critic", explained photographer Arnold Genthe, who knew both men well. "Jack London in those days rarely gave a manuscript its final typing until he submitted the drafts to Sterling."

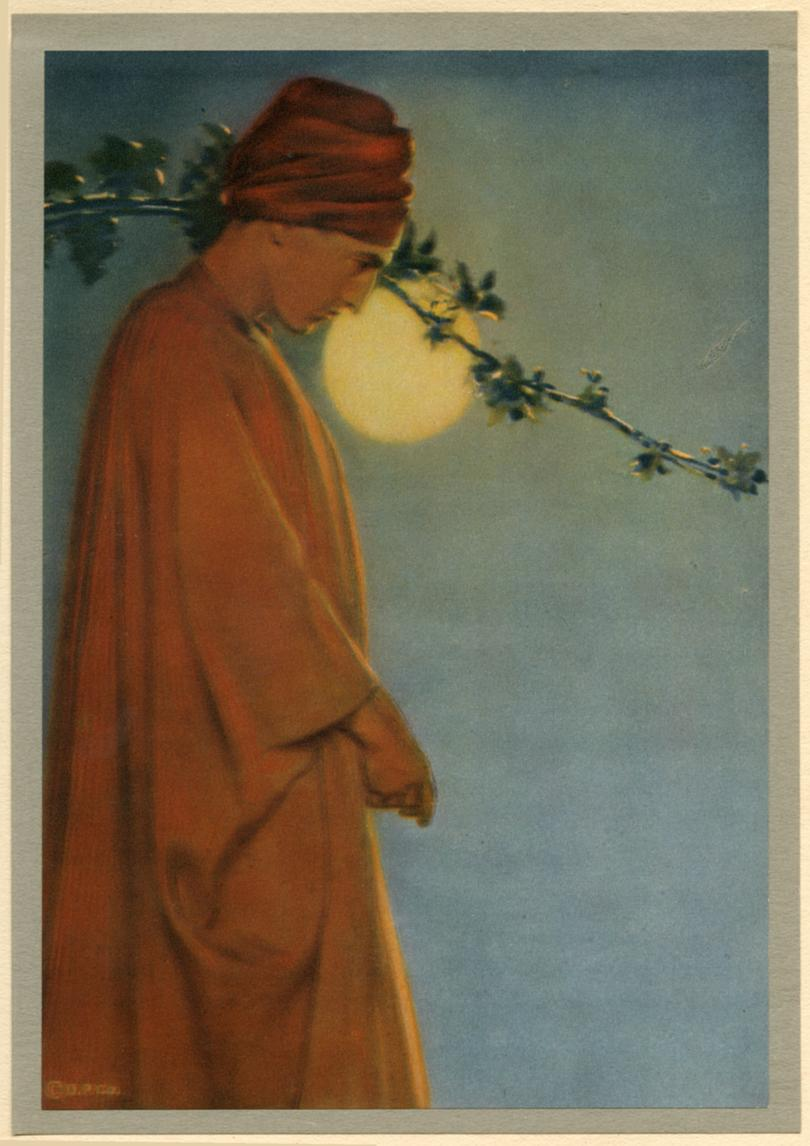
In 1904, George Sterling posed for this photograph by Adelaide Hanscom Leeson which appeared in her 1905 edition of the Rubaiyat of Omar Khayyam.

In the autumn of 1904 the Realty Syndicate and its managers—including Sterling—were attacked by a smear campaign in the San Francisco Examiner. Almost every day the Examiner printed stories accusing the Syndicate of defrauding investors, even though the Syndicate had always paid its loan and bond payments on time. On November 18, 1904, Sterling resigned as a director of the Syndicate—although he would remain its employee. He had been a director for nine years. That December, George also resigned from the board of Oakland Traction Consolidated. In January 1905, George stepped down as the Real Estate Combine's chairman, but remained its vice president and a member of its board.

That January, a grand jury opened an investigation into the conduct of the Realty Syndicate and its officers. Then six investors sued Sterling and other Syndicate officers, accusing them of lying to defraud investors. In addition, the California State Senate opened an investigation of the Syndicate. The senators who opened the State Senate investigation were convicted of taking bribes from the Examiner, so their investigation was dropped. The lawsuit was also dropped. Eventually the months-long grand jury investigation found no evidence of any wrongdoing.

Sterling decided to quit his business career and become a full-time poet. He wanted to move out of the San Francisco Bay Area and its distractions. Carrie was reluctant to leave her family, friends, and active social life, but hoped going away might keep her husband from chasing other women. On March 4, 1905, they took a train to Monterey to investigate moving there. They were welcomed by Bohemian Club member Charles Rollo Peters, a landscape painter with a thirty-acre estate near Monterey. He showed them nearby sights, including a forested artists' colony, population 75, with white sand beaches. The village was named Carmel-by-the-Sea.

On March 30 Sterling announced to the press he "will relinquish his connection with the Realty Syndicate and retire to private life" in June. He said of Carmel, "as beautiful as it is secluded, I expect to have the right sort of energy to give the world my best work".

=== Carmel-by-the-Sea: 1905–1914 ===
On June 4, 1905, George and Carrie Sterling bought an acre of land in Carmel-by-the-Sea, California, 114 miles south of Oakland. They also rented two additional acres, where they planned to grow their own vegetables. The Sterlings' lot sat on a hilltop in the Eighty Acres tract, on the east side of Torres Street between 10th Avenue and 11th Avenue. The Sterlings purchased the third lot after 10th Avenue.

On June 30, George began a diary: "Arrived at Carmel: Geo. Sterling, W. E. Wood, R. L. [Richard] Partington. Fine weather. Put up small tent." The next day the men "Put up large tent" for them to live in while they prepared the site and built a house for the Sterlings. William E. Wood was in charge of construction. In Sterling's words, "Wood was a 'boss carpenter' under his father, in Vancouver". He was a friend of Sterling and Partington; in fact, Dick Partington had once painted Wood's portrait. Other Sterling friends arrived. Especially helpful was Sag Harbor pal Gene Fenlon, who had once worked as a circus strongman.

==== George Sterling house ====
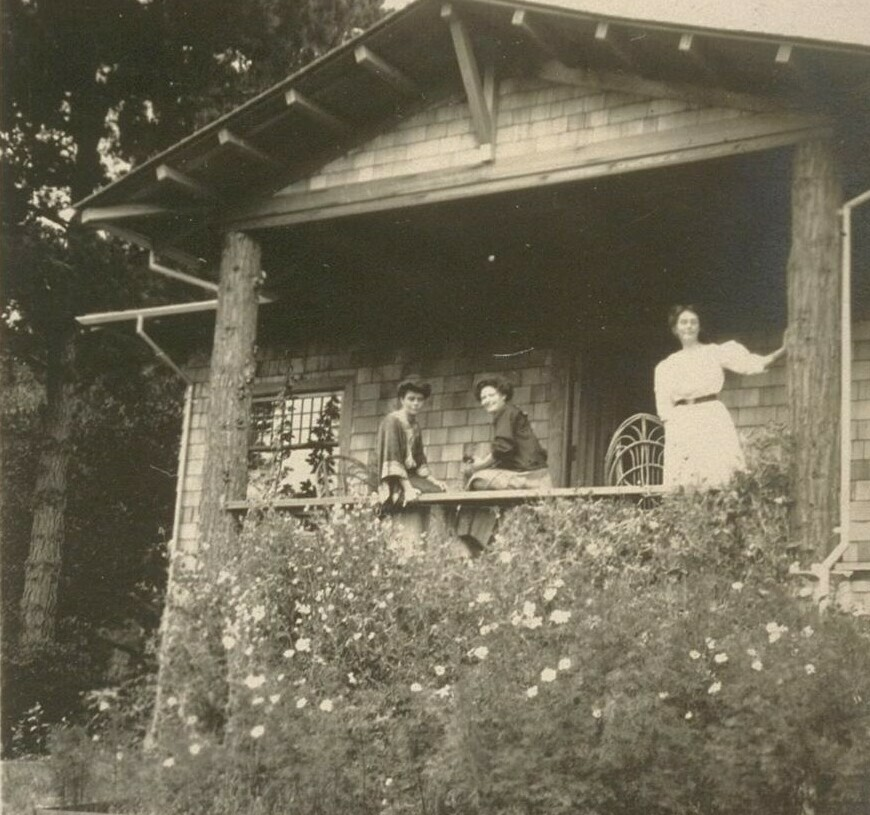
Carrie Sterling and others at Sterling Cottage

The Sterlings' American Craftsman bungalow had a thirty-foot-long by eighteen-foot-wide living room with oiled redwood paneling, a fireplace, and chimney made from Carmel stone. It had views of Carmel Valley, Carmel River, and the Santa Lucia Mountains.

Photographer Arnold Genthe stopped by while the house was under construction. He became the first of many Sterling friends to follow him to Carmel, building a larger Craftsman house nearby that copied some features of the Sterling home.

The Sterlings left Piedmont and moved into their new Carmel home on August 18, 1905. Sterling still couldn't leave Frank Havens' corporate work behind. Havens pleaded for Sterling's help. The Sterlings needed the "indecently large" pay, so for the next five years George continued to work for Havens' corporations, most months spending one to three weeks at work in San Francisco or Oakland and the rest of his time in Carmel.

Sterling encouraged classically trained singer and pianist Mabel Gray Lachmund Young to move to Carmel. In 1905, builder M.J. Murphy built her a small redwood cottage on Lincoln, which still survives today, including her "LACHMUND" sign near its front gate and Carmel's last surviving tent cabin in its back yard.

Sterling planted two acres of potatoes, peas, and other crops, but he was not a successful farmer. His soil was not fertile, and cows knocked down his fences to eat his crops. They were also raided by groundhogs. He was more successful getting food by fishing, especially shellfish such as mussels, crabs, and abalone, and by hunting. He recorded in his Carmel Diaries shooting hundreds of birds and animals.

==== 1906 earthquake and aftermath ====
At 5:12 on the morning of April 18, Sterling was at home in Carmel when a mighty earthquake struck: "The shock even there was terrific—I thought it would never let up. We all ran out on the front veranda ... My two big rock chimneys were shattered, and broken up entirely 'from the roof up'."

North in San Francisco (at that time the nation's ninth-largest city), the 1906 San Francisco earthquake and fire destroyed hundreds of city blocks and left more than 225,000 people homeless. Several refugees fled to Carmel. To accommodate visitors, the Sterlings added a tent-cabin and a large tent. They converted part of their woodshed into a second kitchen for visitors' use. Members of the Partington family stayed with the Sterlings for months. Some Sterling friends moved permanently to Carmel in 1906, including novelist Mary Austin and writer James Hopper with his wife and children.

More than 100,000 San Franciscans fled to East Bay cities such as Oakland, Berkeley, and Emeryville, where Sterling's uncle Frank kept him busy as his companies exploded with growth. In January 1907 Sterling was elected corporate secretary of the Piedmont Development company and treasurer of the Real Estate Combine. That year he and Carrie sold their former home in Piedmont to Traylor Bell, a son of Harmon Bell.

The biggest three personal events during 1907 for the Sterlings were the nationwide scandal over Sterling's "A Wine of Wizardry", Sterling's mentor Ambrose Bierce visiting in August, and, while George was in Oakland, the suicide of young poet Nora May French in the Sterlings' Carmel home.

==== Colony of artists, writers, and musicians ====
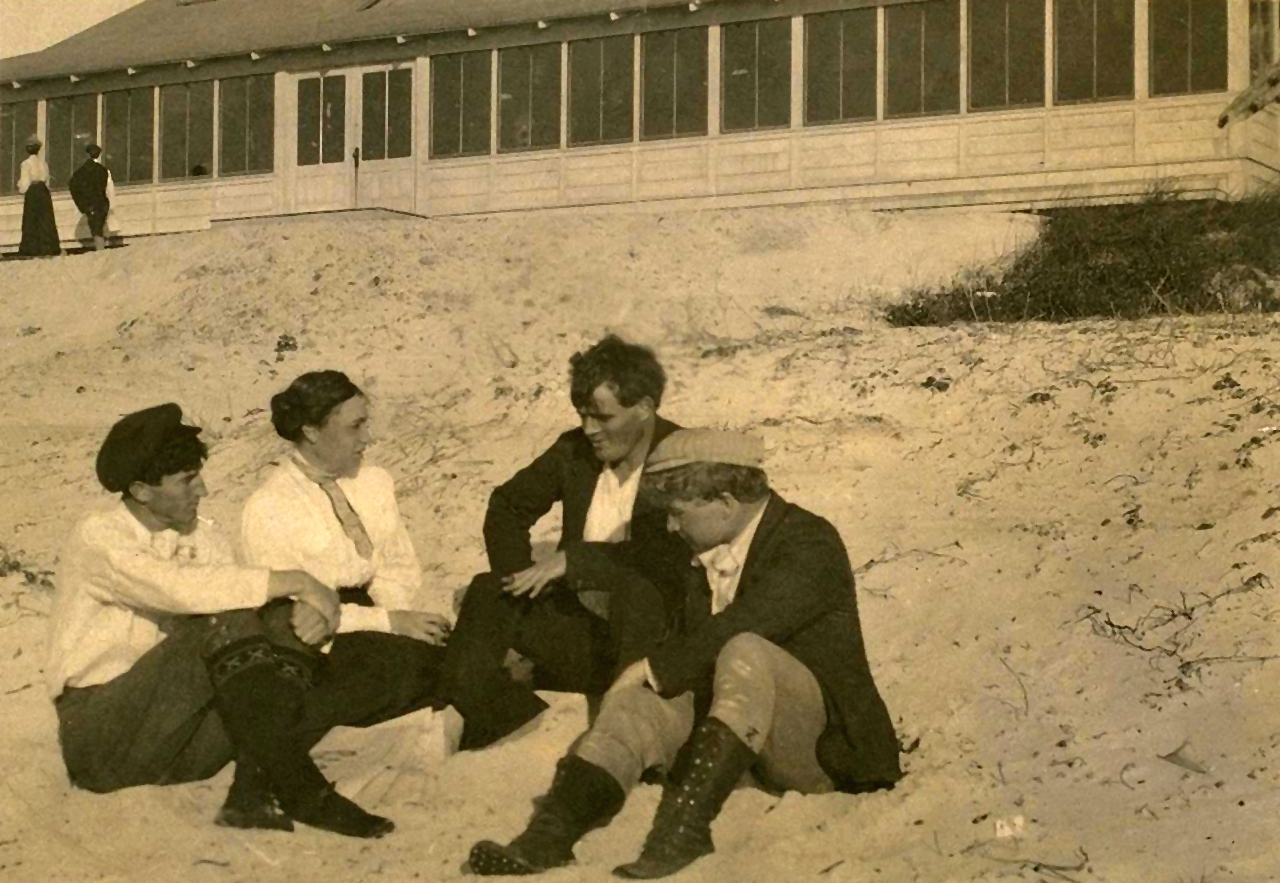
George Sterling, Mary Austin, Jack London, and James Hopper on Carmel beach

A colony of artists and painters already lived in Carmel before the Sterlings moved there. Both George and Carrie Sterling were active in the Carmel Arts and Crafts Club, raising funds for its new clubhouse, designed and built in 1907 by Sterling's builder William E. Wood. On July 16, 1908, Sterling was toastmaster for thirty-two members of the club for the first annual breakfast at its clubhouse.

Sterling attracted literary residents, including writer Frederick R. Bechdolt in 1907, and in 1908 actor and aspiring writer Herbert Peet (who changed his name to Herbert Heron) and his wife Sara Opal Piontkowski Heron, editor and writer Michael Williams, writer Kenneth MacNichol, writing student William Rose Benét, and newspaper reporter Grant Wallace.

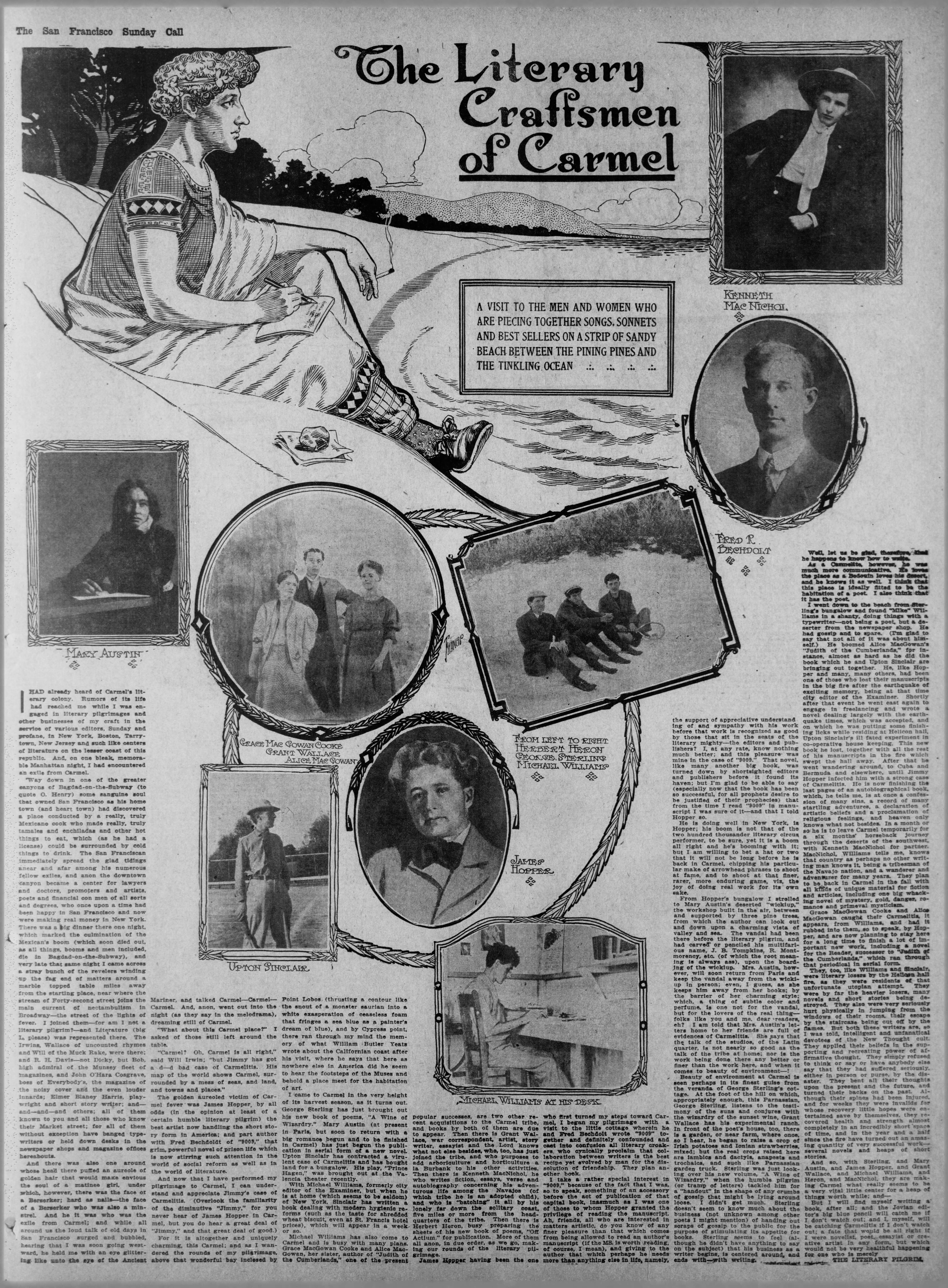
1909, Jan. 7: George Sterling and other writers in "The Literary Craftsmen of Carmel", San Francisco Call, p. 5

After best-selling author Upton Sinclair's New Jersey utopian experiment Helicon Home Colony burned, Sinclair arrived in Carmel October 31, 1908, looking for a new place to live. He stayed one night in Sterling's guest cabin and the next night Arnold Genthe "let Sinclair have his bungalow". Sinclair was followed by fellow Helicon refugees the sister novelists Alice MacGowan and Grace MacGowan Cooke, Grace's daughter Helen, and a red-headed aspiring writer who everybody called "Red" or "Hal", but whose actual name was Harry Sinclair Lewis. Later he would become the first American writer to win the Nobel Prize for Literature, but in 1909 Lewis wanted to meet his idol Sterling and learn how to be a writer. Lewis roomed with William Rose Benét. Sterling got Lewis a job with the San Francisco Evening Bulletin, and later helped him sell short-story ideas to Jack London. A leading San Francisco newspaper profiled Carmel's wave of new inhabitants in a full-page story "The Literary Craftsmen of Carmel". The page was topped with a drawing of Sterling smoking a cigarette (which he never did) while writing on a wooded beach.

Sterling regularly harvested enough abalones to hold abalone feasts for his friends, often on the "Cooke's Cove" beach, a block away from the MacGowan sisters' house on Thirteenth Avenue. Abalone meat is tough. To make it edible, Sterling and his guests had to pound raw abalones with rocks. Sterling made their task fun by writing "The Abalone Song" for them to chant in rhythm as they pounded. It became his most popular song, almost an anthem for Carmel-by-the-Sea.

Sterling's Carmel Diaries became a catalog of parties, both with local residents and with dozens of visitors. George and Carrie both drank frequently and in large quantities, especially George. Upton Sinclair liked Carmel and seriously considered staying there, but told George he would do so only if Sterling stopped drinking. Sterling promised to abstain, but soon was visibly drunk again. Sinclair left, but the two men remained friends for the rest of Sterling's life. In 1909, another writer arrived: young Vera Connolly moved into her family's cottage on the corner of Casanova and Thirteenth to care for her mother Mary. Although just a student at the University of California, Connolly already had sold a short story to a national magazine.

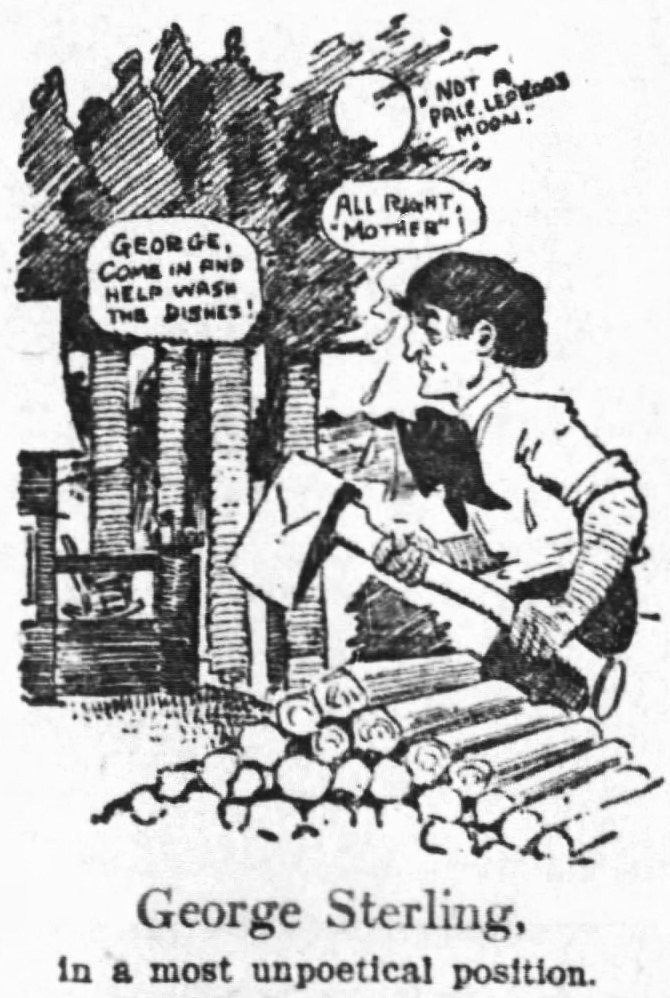
May 22, 1910, Los Angeles Times cartoon of George Sterling by Edmund Waller Gale makes fun of Sterling calling his wife "Mother". "Pale, leprous moon" quotes Sterling's "A Wine of Wizardry".

In 1910 Frank Havens and his partner Francis M. Smith were dividing their jointly owned empire of corporations, so Sterling spent most of January, February, and April away from Carmel, working on the split. The biggest news in Carmel was the in-progress outdoor Forest Theater. Construction started in February. Herbert Heron was in charge, but both Sterlings worked on it. Jack and Charmian London visited the Sterlings for 21 days, from February 26 through March 14, the last of their three trips to Camel. In May, the Los Angeles Times printed a long, satiric profile of Carmel headlined "Where Author and Artist Folk Are Establishing the Most Amazing Colony on Earth" by Willard Huntington Wright (later a millionaire for writing Philo Vance mysteries under his pen name S. S. Van Dine), with four cartoons by Edmund "Ted" Waller Gale. The San Francisco Examiner also poked fun at the town: "Carmel, as you know, is a community composed entirely of poets. ... Show me a single citizen of Carmel who is not a poet and I show you ... a carpet-bagger, not a real Carmelite!"

Carmel's new 1,000-seat outdoor theater presented its first play in July 1910. Carrie Sterling acted in a small part. New literary residents of Carmel that year included the Sterlings' long-time friends Perry Newberry and his wife Bertha Newberry, as well as Inez Haynes Gillmore and bestselling novelist and playwright Harry Leon Wilson. Ambrose Bierce visited the Sterlings in Carmel in August (staying at the Pine Tree Inn) and stayed with them for ten days in Yosemite.

==== The Sterlings' marriage deteriorates ====
By the middle of 1910, George's affair with Vera Connolly had progressed to the point where Carrie contemptuously called her "that Connolly girl". George and Vera flirted in front of Carrie openly. "---- 'em!" Carrie angrily wrote. George had committed several infidelities in Carmel, but there is no record of others this blatant. Carrie left Carmel to spend Christmastime and her January 1 birthday in New York City with Frank Havens and his wife, Carrie's oldest sister Lila—away from George. While Carrie was away, Vera Connolly and two friends from Berkeley stayed for a week at the Sterling's Carmel house and celebrated New Year's Eve with George. By Carrie's January 14, 1911 return to Carmel, gossip about George and Vera was the talk of Carmelites. Sterling got Connolly pregnant; she had a miscarriage or an abortion. Sterling reported: "some of them [his Carmel neighbors] fight shy of me, because they think I'm immoral—or unmoral: Grace [MacGowan] Cook[e], [Arthur H.] Vachell, and the [Frederick] Bechdolts are the worst. I mean at disliking me." Carrie was also ostracized. Connolly's mother took her away from Carmel to stay with relatives in Leavenworth, Kansas, from May to early September, and then to Washington, D.C.

On May 25, 1911 the Sterlings left Carmel with Frank and Lila Havens to spend summer in Sag Harbor, New York. They stayed in a mansion Havens built on the town's largest beach, which Havens owned. It was George's first return to Sag Harbor since leaving it twenty-one years ago. He thoroughly enjoyed visiting his boyhood town and his uncle's lavish hospitality. He wrote to Bierce about Connolly: "I don't want you to think I'm caddish in telling you we were in love with each other. We were, and are, though for Carrie's sake we've got to keep apart." Bierce visited the Sterlings and Havens in Sag Harbor that August. George and Carrie separately discussed the George-and-Vera situation with him. After Bierce left, George visited New York City, where he met young Mary Craig Kimbrough and immediately began writing love letters and love poems to her. The Sterlings left New York to return to California, stopping on September 20 to see the Grand Canyon. They returned to Carmel October. 2, 1911.

On January 16, 1912, the Sterlings were at home in Carmel when they received a telegram. Their brother-in-law Harry Maxwell—the prosperous husband of Carrie's sister Nell—had suddenly died in Oakland. George and Carrie were shocked. Harry and Nell had just left Carmel on Carrie's birthday fifteen days ago. They took the morning train from Monterey to Oakland for Maxwell's funeral, held at his large house in Piedmont. Carrie refused to return to Carmel. "Carmel has become so hateful to me", Carrie wrote to Ambrose Bierce: "I find it just about impossible to live there longer." She and George stayed in Piedmont until January 31, when George "Returned on the afternoon train, alone."

For the next fourteen months, Carrie lived in Piedmont while George stayed in Carmel. He visited her frequently and they seemed to get along well together. While Carrie was away, fledgling poet Clark Ashton Smith stayed with George for a month at the Sterlings' bungalow. Ambrose Bierce made a short visit to Carmel in September, 1912. Carrie came to Carmel in April, 1913 to stay with George for almost three weeks. She went back to Piedmont to gather her belongings, then on May 30 moved back with George in Carmel. For nearly six months they tried to live together, but eventually Carrie told George she wanted a divorce. The last entry Sterling made in their Carmel diaries was November 24, 1913: "Carrie has left me."

Sterling wrote to Clark Ashton Smith: "Carrie has once more left me, this time for ever, I fear. She says it's neither my fault nor hers; if it's anyone's it's mine, as I'm sure I should have written more and drunk less. Damn poets marrying, anyhow! I guess the news will come out in the papers to-day or to-morrow. I only hope they put all the blame on me, as she deserves none. ... It's a heart-troubling thing to break up an intimacy of twenty years' standing. Such things send their roots very deep & wide."

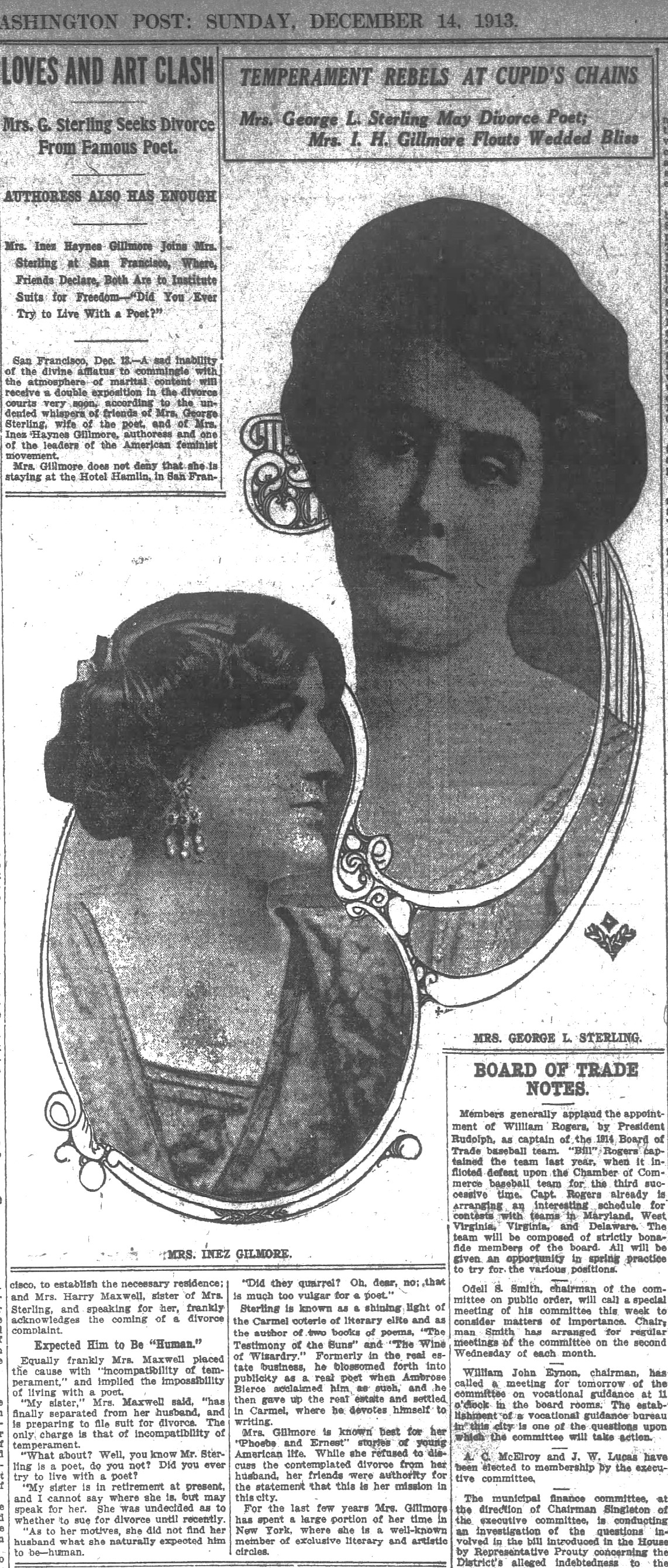
Washington Post says Carrie Sterling and Inez Haynes Gillmore seek divorces. (Dec. 14, 1913)

On Sterling's 44th birthday (December 1, 1913) newspaper headlines proclaimed Carrie had filed for divorce. The Washington Post story, headlined "Loves and Art Clash: Mrs. G. Sterling Seeks Divorce from Famous Poet", featured a big photo of Carrie and quoted her sister Nell: "The only charge is that of incompatibility of temperament. What about? Well, you know Mr. Sterling is a poet, do you not? Did you ever try to live with a poet?"

Carrie's friend Elsie Martinez believed George's scandal with Connolly "didn't cause the breakup with Carrie herself. It was Mrs. Havens, [Carrie's oldest sister] Lila, who had become a society woman and very proper. ... She decided that Carrie could not stay with George. Carrie was a darling and still devoted to George, and I think she thought poets were that way, that's all. ... She hadn't yet divorced George and George begged her not to divorce him. Finally, Lila decided Carrie should divorce George and start life over again. ... So finally she persuaded Carrie to get a divorce."

George did not oppose Carrie's request. A judge granted their divorce January 5, 1914, to take effect one year later. Eight years after the Sterling's moved into their Carmel dream house, George gave it to Carrie in their divorce and moved out of the bungalow. James Hopper and his family rented the house from Carrie, eventually purchasing it from her.

=== New York City and Sag Harbor: 1914–1915 ===
After the Sterlings' divorce became final in 1914, George moved to New York. His residence in New York City and summer in Sag Harbor is described in the "Literary career and critical responses" section above.

=== San Francisco: 1915–1926 ===
Sterling moved back to San Francisco and into the Bohemian Club. Except for trips to Hollywood to write plays and movies and one more successful stay in New York, Sterling lived for the rest of his life in the Bohemian Club.

In 1918, a wealthy friend paid for Sterling to take a long stay in New York City. He arrived in July and moved into The Lambs Club, intending to stay for months. He met old friend photographer Arnold Genthe and new friends poet Bliss Carman, novelist Theodore Dreiser, socialist reporter John Reed, poet Harry Kemp, and novelist Nina Wilcox Putnam. While he lived in New York, Sterling missed the Bohemian Grove performance of the play The Twilight of the Kings on Saturday, August 3.

The following warm, sunny Thursday afternoon, in Carrie Sterling's cottage on the Havens estate in Piedmont, she "put on her newest gown", lay down on her bed, drank poison, clasped a rose in her hands, and died. She left a letter saying "that she had been happy until the time she divorced her husband three years ago, but that the future held nothing and she might as well be dead". At Carrie's request, her ashes were scattered in the forested hills at the back of Joaquin Miller's estate, where she and George had camped many times with their Piedmont friends.

In New York, George Sterling packed his bags and took a train to California "as soon as I could after receiving that shocking news", he told Upton Sinclair. "It was an awful trip, listening day after day to what the car-wheels had to say about me." Sterling wrote to Charmian London: "I did feel horrible indeed. I still do."

== Death ==
On November 15, 1926, H. L. Mencken visited Sterling in San Francisco:

He was in great pain when I called upon him at the Bohemian Club, but his mind was clear, and we had a brief and friendly palaver. I came away convinced that he was desperately ill. He showed every sign of complete exhaustion. That was on Monday. On Tuesday morning I went to see him again, but found him sleeping. On Tuesday night his door was locked, and the transom showed darkness within. I assumed he was still sleeping, and went away. No doubt he was already dead.

Sterling died by suicide in his room at the Bohemian Club; his body was discovered on November 17, 1926. He was 56 years old. Sterling carried a vial of cyanide for many years. When asked about it he said, "A prison becomes a home if you have the key". He was buried in Oakland, California. Mencken wrote: "In the end, with age and illness upon him, he put an end to his life, quietly, simply and decently. It was, I think, a good life—and a good death."

== Legacy and influence ==
H. P. Lovecraft noted of Sterling: "I have the most profound respect for his work & influence in American letters." Several writers were influenced by reading Sterling's works. In addition, because Sterling gratefully remembered the guidance he had received from Ambrose Bierce, he actively mentored and assisted the careers of dozens of young writers.

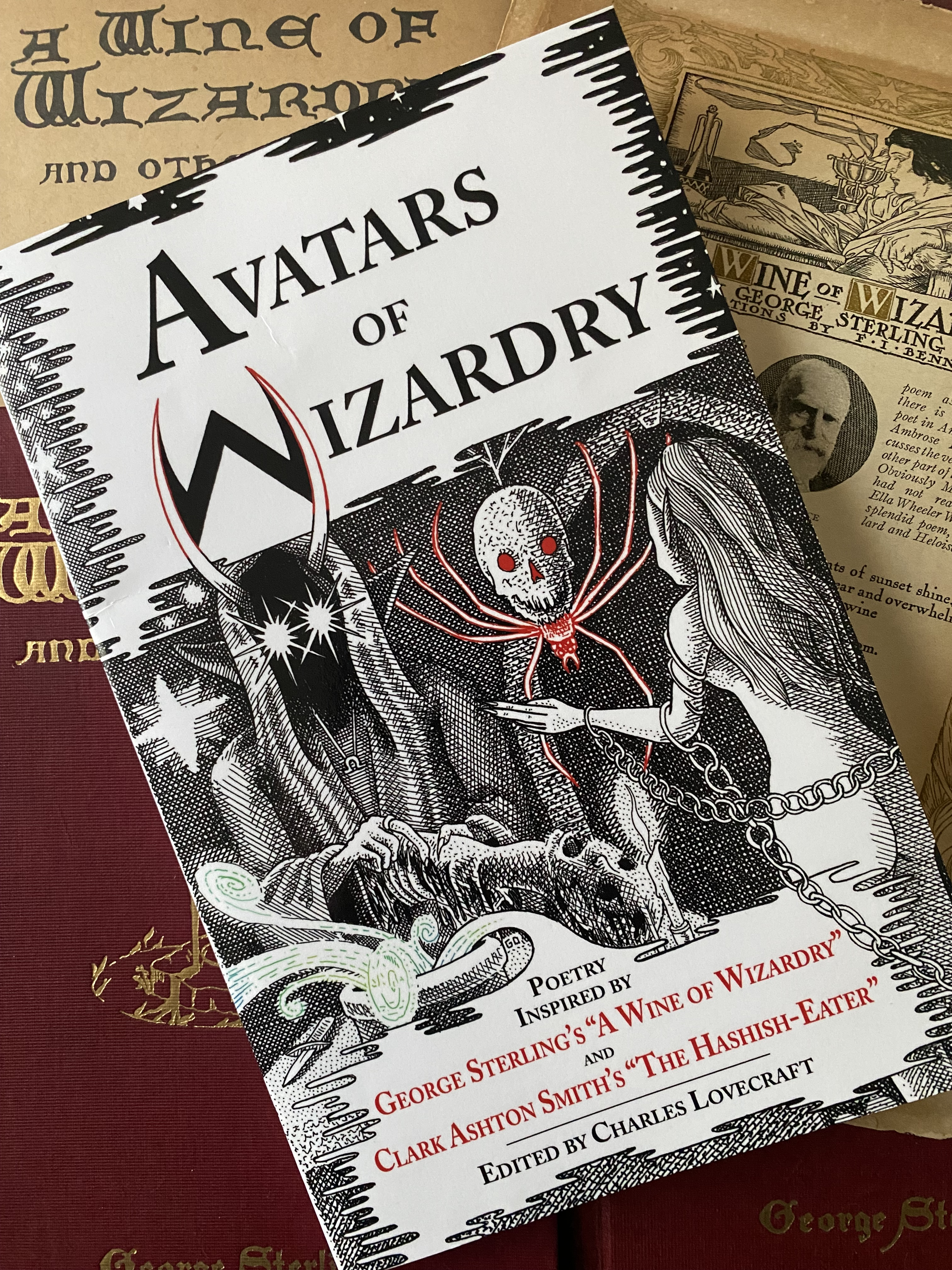
The 2012 book Avatars of Wizardry with earlier 1907–1909 printings of "A Wine of Wizardry" by George Sterling

The single Sterling poem that most influenced other writers (both of poetry and of fiction) was "A Wine of Wizardry". The Wikipedia article on that poem describes writers and writings influenced by "A Wine of Wizardry". In 2012, Australian editor Charles Lovecraft published Avatars of Wizardry, an entire book of poems by American, Canadian, and Australian poets influenced by "A Wine of Wizardry".

Other works by Sterling have influenced writers as well. For example, Porter Garnett described how Sterling's 1907 play The Triumph of Bohemia influenced Garnett's 1911 play The Green Knight.

Writers influenced by Sterling include Jack London (as described in "Life and business career" section above), Clark Ashton Smith, Robinson Jeffers, Audrey Wurdemann, Sinclair Lewis, Ray Bradbury, Porter Garnett, Fritz Leiber, Frances Marion, and others. Upton Sinclair described how Sterling taught Mary Craig Sinclair how to write poetry. Poet Donald Sidney-Fryer said Clark Ashton Smith, during Sidney-Fryer's meetings with Smith, "made me appreciate Sterling strongly. To me Sterling was the epitome of Romanticism which strongly influenced my style of Romanticism".

Several writers wrote tribute poems to or about Sterling during his lifetime, such as Jack London's poem "George Sterling." After Sterling's death, many writers wrote essays or memorial poems about him. The most well-known Sterling memorial poem is Lost Harbor by Leslie Nelson Jennings. It has been reprinted, excerpted, and quoted hundreds of times in books, magazines, newspapers, and speeches, and on monuments and grave markers.

=== As a fictional character ===
In addition to Sterling's writings, his colorful life and personality inspired several writers to create fictional characters based on him.

- Jack London depicted Sterling as fictional characters four times:
  - as Walt Irvine in the 1906 short story "Brown Wolf";
  - as Russ Brissenden in the autobiographical novel Martin Eden (1909);
  - as Mark Hall (a pun on Sterling silver hallmarks) in The Valley of the Moon (1913);
  - and as the poet Leo in The Little Lady of the Big House.
- Gelett Burgess wrote a novel The Heart Line: A Drama of San Francisco (1907) with a character Philip Starr based on Sterling and central characters based on Sterling's friends Isabel Fraser and Porter Garnett.
- Mary Hunter Austin, in her novel Outland, set in a fantasy version of Carmel-by-the-Sea (and first published in London in 1910 under the pseudonym Gordon Stairs), modeled her villain Ravenutzi on Sterling at the poet's request.
- Dashiell Hammett based his character Burke Pangburn on Sterling in the short story "The Girl with the Silver Eyes" (1924). At the time Hammett wrote this story, he and Sterling lived in San Francisco only eight blocks apart.
- William Rose Benét won a Pulitzer Prize for his autobiographical The Dust Which Is God: A Novel in Verse (1941). It features poet Starr Gorham, a character based on Sterling, and quotes verses from Sterling's "The Abalone Song".
- Fritz Leiber's father, Fritz Leiber, Sr., had played the key role of Death in Irving Thalberg's enormous production of Sterling's The Play of Everyman in the Hollywood Bowl. Leiber was a fan of Sterling's writings. He made the poet a character in his 1977 horror fantasy Our Lady of Darkness, which won the World Fantasy Award for best novel.
- Ray Faraday Nelson's short story "Valse Trieste" imagines a traveler coming upon a large mansion with people in an enormous ballroom waltzing to Jean Sibelius' "Valse Trieste" (Sad Waltz). The dancers include Sterling, and they all turn out to be suicides, dancing in Jack London's mansion Wolf House.
- Bill Broder's play Abalone! (first produced 2016, first published 2020) portrays an imaginary meeting between Sterling, Ambrose Bierce, and Mary Austin.

== Gallery ==
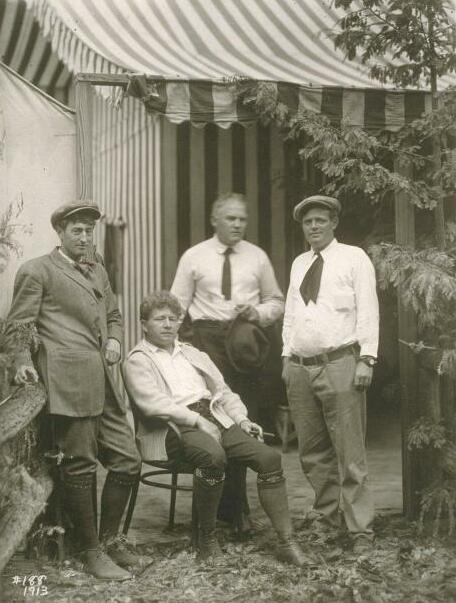
George Sterling, James Hopper, Harry Leon Wilson, London. Bohemian Grove

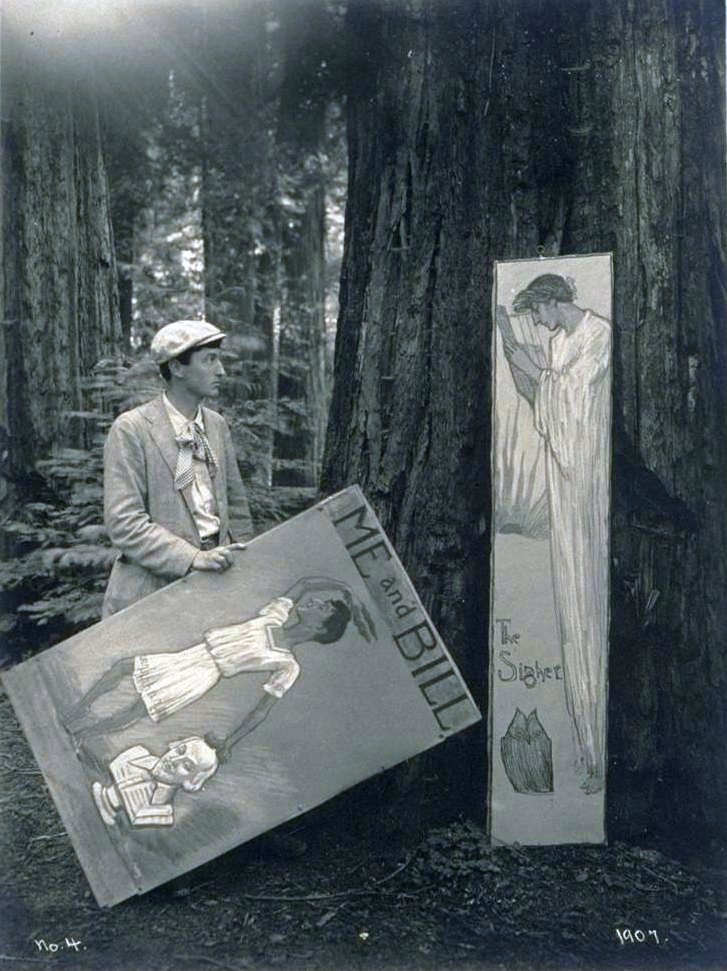
Sterling, posing with caricatures of himself at the Bohemian Grove, 1907

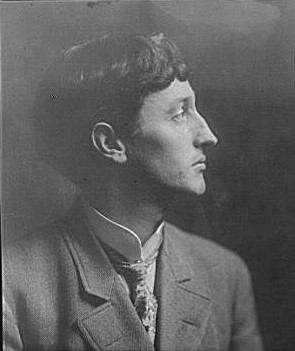
Portrait photograph of George Sterling taken by Arnold Genthe February 9, 1904

== Memorials ==
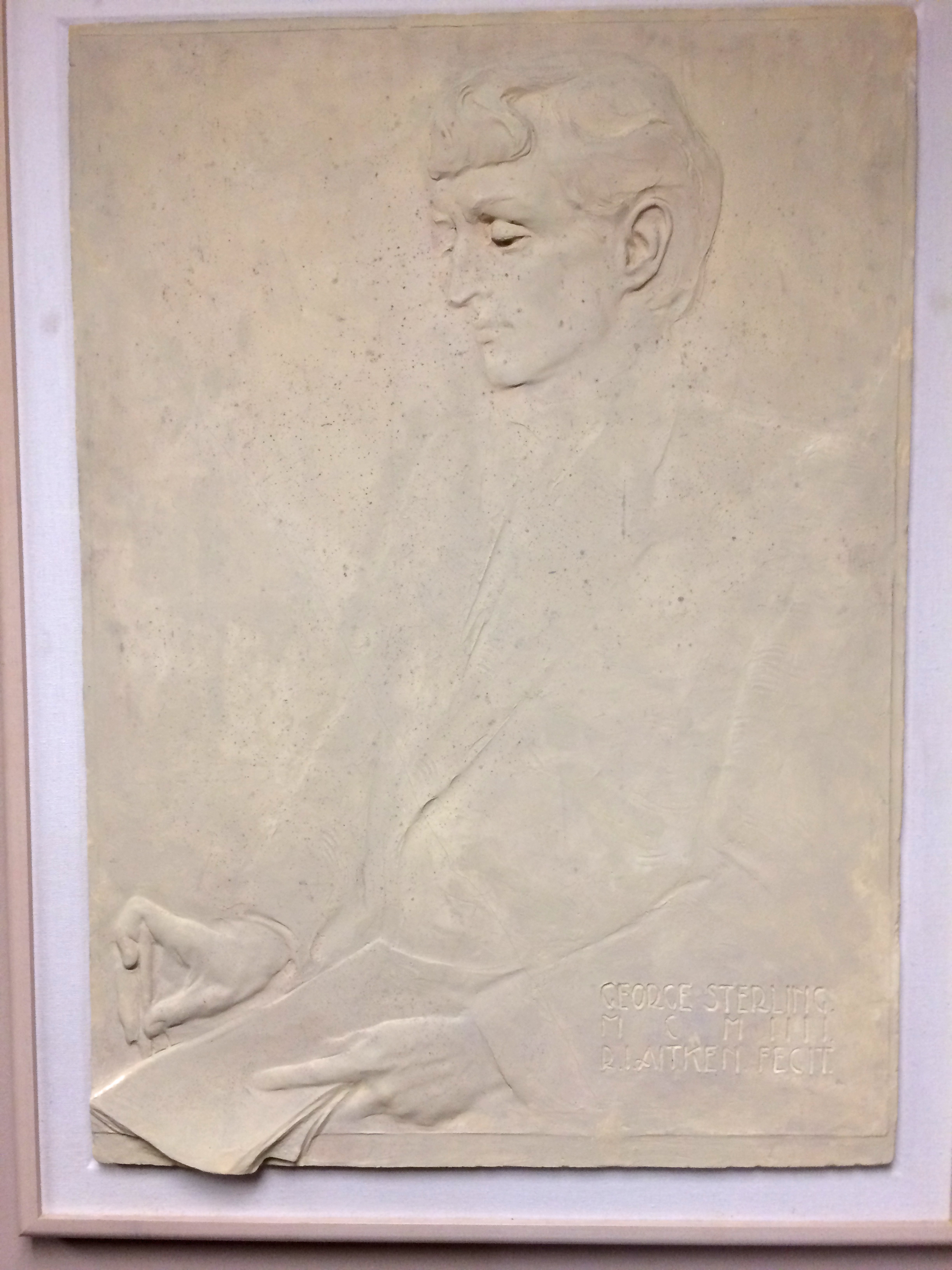
1904 Robert Ingersoll Aitken bas relief sculpture of poet George Sterling

Memorials to Sterling include a World War II ship named after him, sculptures portraying him, paintings of him and his works, streets named after him, George Sterling Park in San Francisco, memorial magazine issues dedicated to Sterling, memorial poems, monuments displaying his poetry, and his grave in Oakland, California.

== Writings ==
=== Poetry ===
==== Poetry volumes published during Sterling's lifetime ====
- The Testimony of the Suns and Other Poems (San Francisco: W. E. Wood, 1903; San Francisco: A. M. Robertson, 1904, 1907)
- A Wine of Wizardry and Other Poems (San Francisco: A. M. Robertson, 1909; [Sag Harbor, NY]: Brickiln Press, 2002)
- The House of Orchids and Other Poems (San Francisco: A. M. Robertson, 1911)
- Beyond the Breakers and Other Poems (San Francisco: A. M. Robertson, 1914)
- Ode on the Opening of the Panama–Pacific International Exposition (San Francisco: A. M. Robertson, 1915)
- The Evanescent City (San Francisco: A. M. Robertson, 1915)
- The Caged Eagle and Other Poems (San Francisco: A. M. Robertson, 1916)
- Yosemite: An Ode (San Francisco: A. M. Robertson, 1916)
- The Binding of the Beast and Other War Verse (San Francisco: A. M. Robertson, 1917)
- Thirty-Five Sonnets (San Francisco: Book Club of California, 1917)
- To a Girl Dancing (San Francisco: Grabhorn, 1921)
- Sails and Mirage and Other Poems (San Francisco: A. M. Robertson, 1921)
- Selected Poems (New York: Henry Holt, 1923; San Francisco: A. M. Robertson, 1923; St. Clair Shores, Michigan: Scholarly Press, 1970; [Irvine, Calif.]: Reprint Services, 1974)
- Strange Waters (San Francisco: [Paul Elder?], 1926).

==== Poetry volumes published posthumously ====
- The Testimony of the Suns, Including Comments, Suggestions, and Annotations by Ambrose Bierce: A Facsimile of the Original Typewritten Manuscript with the Marginal Notes by George Sterling in Black Ink and the Comments by Ambrose Bierce in Red Ink (San Francisco: Book Club of California, 1927).
- Sonnets to Craig, Upton Sinclair, ed. (Long Beach, Calif.: Upton Sinclair, 1928; New York: Albert & Charles Boni, 1928). [Sinclair published both hardcover and paperback editions in 1928.]
- Five Poems ([San Francisco]: Windsor Press, 1928).
- Poems to Vera (New York: Oxford University Press, 1938).
- After Sunset, R. H. Barlow, ed. (San Francisco: John Howell, 1939).
- A Wine of Wizardry and Three Other Poems, Dale L. Walker, ed. (Fort Johnson: "a private press", 1964).
- George Sterling: A Centenary Memoir-Anthology, Charles Angoff, ed. (South Brunswick and New York: Poetry Society of America, 1969).
- The Thirst of Satan: Poems of Fantasy and Terror, S. T. Joshi, ed. (New York: Hippocampus Press, 2003).
- Complete Poetry, S. T. Joshi and David E. Schultz, eds. (New York: Hippocampus Press, 2013).
- El Testimonio de los Soles y Otros Poemas: Edicióne Crítica y Bilingüe, Ariadna García Carreño, ed. and translator (Madrid: Editorial Verbum, 2022).
- El Vino de la Hechicería y Otras Herejías: Edicióne Crítica y Bilingüe, Ariadna García Carreño, ed. and translator (Madrid: Editorial Verbum, 2024).

=== Plays ===
- The Triumph of Bohemia: A Forest Play, music by Edward F. Schneider (San Francisco: Bohemian Club, 1907).
- A Masque of the Cities with Henry Anderson Lafler, music by several composers ([Oakland]: [Oakland Commercial Club], 1913).
- The Play of Everyman, based on the play by Hugo von Hofmannsthal, adapted and translated by Sterling with "Richard" Ryszard Ordynski, music by Victor Schertzinger (San Francisco: A. M. Robertson, 1917); music by Einar Nelson (Los Angeles: Primavera Press, 1939).
- The Twilight of the Kings with Richard Hotaling and [uncredited] Porter Garnett, music by Wallace Arthur Sabin (San Francisco: Bohemian Club, 1918).
- Lilith: A Dramatic Poem (San Francisco: A. M. Robertson, 1919; San Francisco: Book Club of California, 1920; New York: Macmillan, 1926).
- Rosamund: A Dramatic Poem (San Francisco: A. M. Robertson, 1920).
- Truth, (Chicago: Bookfellows, 1923; New York: AMS Press, 1970).
- Truth: A Grove Play, music by Domenico Brescia (San Francisco: Bohemian Club, 1926).

=== Songs ===
- Songs, music by Lawrence Zenda (Rosaliene Travis, pseud.), (San Francisco: Sherman, Clay, 1916, 1918, 1928).
- "You Are So Beautiful", music by Lawrence Zenda (Rosaliene Travis, pseud.), (San Francisco: Sherman, Clay, 1917).
- "We're A-Going" (San Francisco: Sherman, Clay, 1918).
- "The Flag", music "March of the Men of Harlech" (traditional), (San Francisco: A. M. Robertson, 1918).
- "Love Song", music by John H. Densmore, (New York: G. Schirmer, 1926).
- "The Abalone Song", with additional verses by Opal Heron, Sinclair Lewis, Michael Williams, and others, (San Francisco: Albert M. Bender [Grabhorn Press], 1937; San Francisco: Windsor Press, 1943; Los Angeles: Tuscan Press, 1998).

=== Nonfiction ===
- Robinson Jeffers: The Man and the Artist (New York: Boni & Liveright, 1926).

=== Fiction ===
- Babes in the Wood (San Francisco: Vince Emery, 2020).
- The Lovely Lady and Other Stories, S. T. Joshi, ed. (Seattle: Sarnath Press, 2026)
- The Old Devil and Other Stories, S. T. Joshi, ed. (Seattle: Sarnath Press, 2026)

=== Letters ===
- The Letters of George Sterling, Dalton Harvey Gross, ed. (PhD diss: Southern Illinois University, 1968).
- Give a Man a Boat He Can Sail: Letters of George Sterling, James Henry, ed. (Detroit: Harlo, 1980).
- From Baltimore to Bohemia: The Letters of H. L. Mencken and George Sterling, ed. S. T. Joshi (Rutherford, NJ: Fairleigh Dickinson University, 2001).
- Dear Master: Letters of George Sterling to Ambrose Bierce, 1900–1912, Roger K. Larson, ed. (San Francisco: Book Club of California; 2002).
- The Shadow of the Unattained: The Letters of George Sterling and Clark Ashton Smith, David E. Schultz and S. T. Joshi, eds. (New York: Hippocampus Press, 2005).

=== Volumes edited by Sterling ===
- The Letters of Ambrose Bierce, uncredited editor with Bertha Clark Pope, (San Francisco: Book Club of California, 1922). Sterling was co-editor and wrote "A Memoir of Ambrose Bierce" for this volume.
- Continent's End: An Anthology of Contemporary California Poets, ed. with Genevieve Taggard and James Rorty (San Francisco: Book Club of California, 1925).

== Adaptation ==
Duandon by Donald Sidney-Fryer, (first performed 1975 or 1976, Playwrights’ Theatre, Sacramento). A thirty-minute solo play based on Sterling's 1910 poem of the same name: “I performed “Duandon,” a magical-musical-mystery tour de force (narrative) by George Sterling; this occupied the second half-hour. ... How did the audience respond overall? Gratifyingly, with thunderous clamor and loud applause mixed with hoots and hollers of approbation.”
