= A Wine of Wizardry =

1907 fantasy-horror poem by George Sterling

- by George Sterling
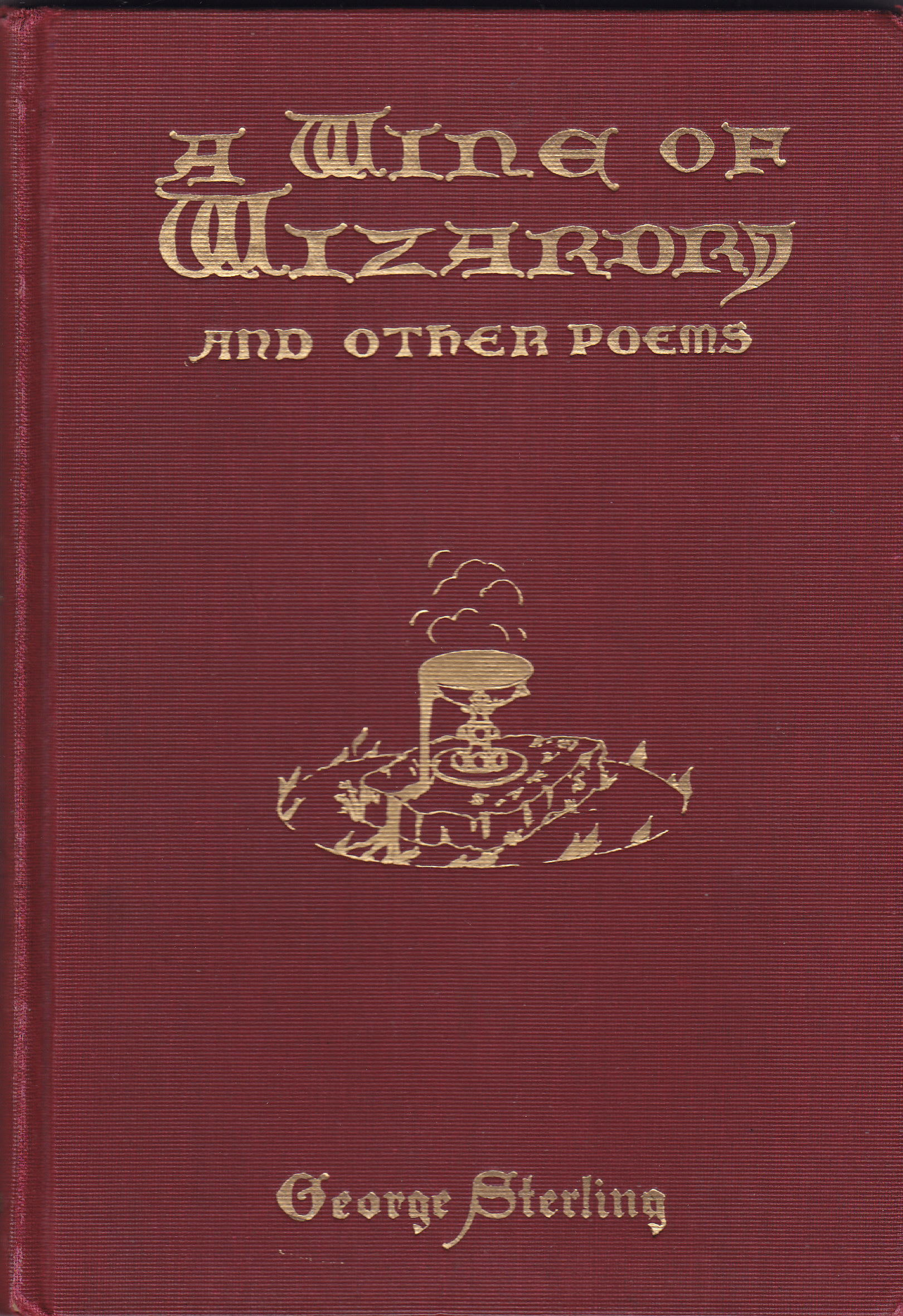
- A Wine of Wizardry and Other Poems, first edition, first state
- Written: 1903–1904
- First published in: 1907
- Cover artist: Herman George Scheffauer
- Country: United States
- Language: English
- Subject: imagination
- Genre(s): fantasy, horror

"A Wine of Wizardry" is a fantasy-horror poem by George Sterling written in 1903 and 1904. When the poem was first published in Cosmopolitan magazine in 1907 with an afterword by Ambrose Bierce it stimulated a nationwide controversy. It was both critically praised and condemned. The poem was reprinted in Sterling's 1908 collection A Wine of Wizardry and Other Poems. It was reprinted again several times, and has been imitated and parodied by many writers, including Sterling himself. The poem inspired Clark Ashton Smith to become a poet and influenced other writers as well.

== Creation of the poem ==
Throughout 1903 George Sterling commuted six days a week from his Piedmont home, crossing the San Francisco Bay by ferry to his uncle Frank Havens' San Francisco headquarters to work as a business executive. One December morning Sterling stood outdoors on a ferryboat's deck. He looked down, fascinated by a colorful oil slick on the surface of the water, making patterns and swirling shapes. He could write a poem about that—but not about an unpoetic oil slick. What else could someone gaze into to see visions? He thought of a glass of port wine reflecting a red sunset. His poem would be a fantasy tribute to the power of imagination, a series of red and purple visions linked by a narrator imagining the travels of a winged woman named Fancy (perhaps borrowed from Sterling's hero John Keats' poem "Fancy"). Once Sterling had his idea, "I was only three mornings in writing the new poem, but longer polishing it," he wrote to his mentor Ambrose Bierce.

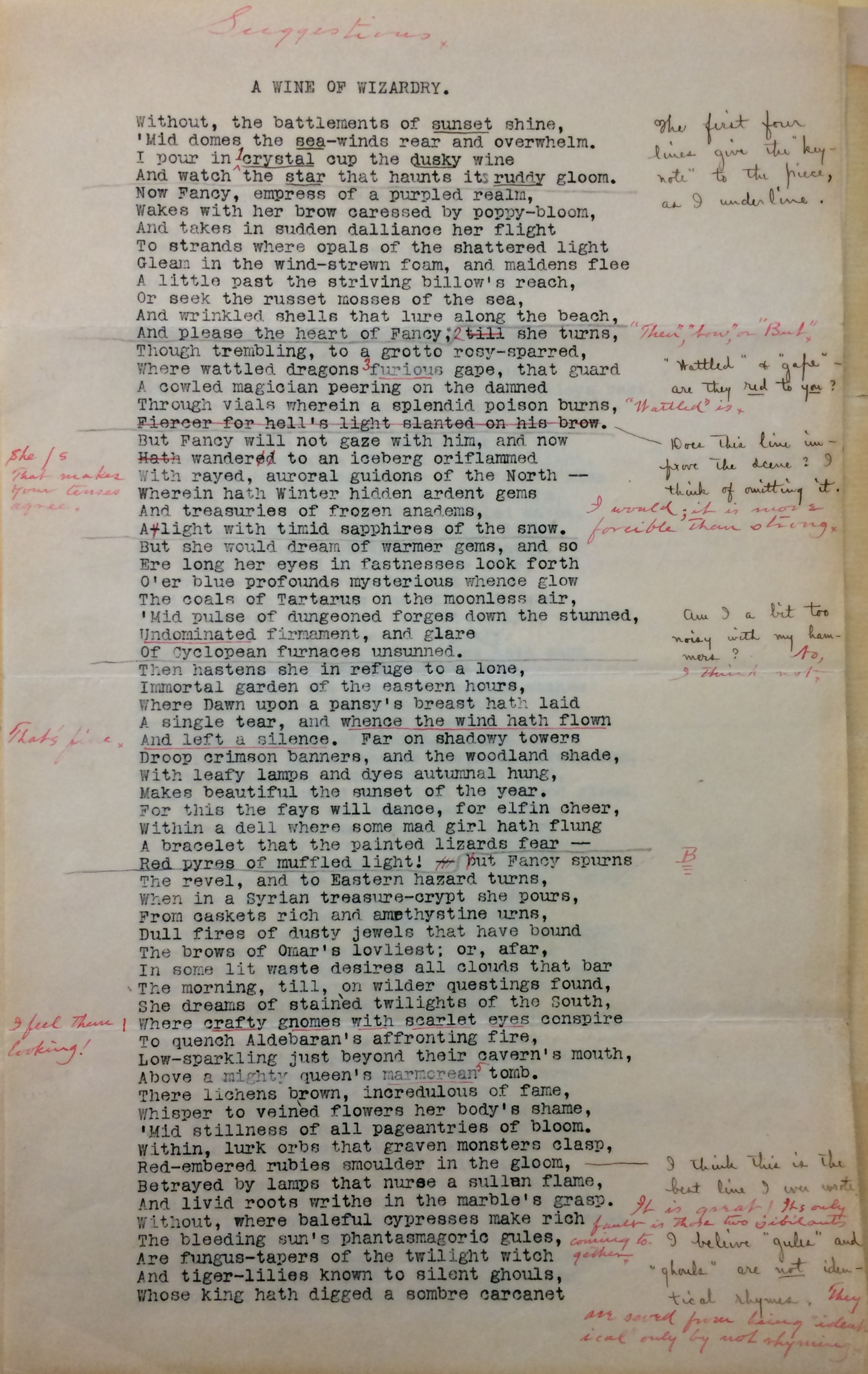
First page of January 1904 draft of "A Wine of Wizardry" with comments in black by George Sterling and in red ink with black pencil rules by Ambrose Bierce

Sterling sent Bierce a draft of "A Wine of Wizardry" on January 25, 1904. Bierce was thrilled: "And the poem! I hardly know how to speak of it. No poem in English of equal length has so bewildering a wealth of imagination. Not Spenser himself has flung such a profusion of pearls into so small a casket. Why, man, it takes away the breath!"

When Bierce wrote "so bewildering a wealth of imagination," "bewildering" was an apt word. Sterling wanted "A Wine of Wizardry" to bewilder, to mystify, to exhaust his reader. His lyrics, structured as twenty-nine long run-on sentences, were complex. He crammed into his poem forty obscure euphonious words, more than fifty terms invoking "purple" and "red," twenty-nine mythological creatures, and five astronomical bodies. "A Wine of Wizardry" is a celebration of the overwhelming power of imagination. In the poem, Fancy flies to many places briefly. Sterling's desire to bewilder his reader is demonstrated by his struggle with Bierce over whether or not to make his long poem more clear by simply adding blank lines between Fancy's travels to make each destination distinct. The draft Sterling first sent to Bierce was 149 lines long with only one blank line just before the poem's last part. Bierce painstakingly drew pencil underlines throughout Sterling's draft indicating where Sterling could place twelve more blank lines to increase understandability. Sterling had the poem retyped using Bierce's divisions but then rejected them. He continued to rework his poem, arguing with Bierce for months about blank lines until Sterling finally agreed to add just four more blanks, breaking his long work into six sections.

Bierce told Sterling he would try to sell "A Wine of Wizardry" to national magazine editors he knew. The first editors who read the poem rejected it, so Bierce wrote an essay praising Sterling and his poem. He offered editors of magazines "A Wine of Wizardry" bundled with his essay. Even though Bierce had a national reputation, editors still turned it down. Sterling's fantasy poem was too unconventional for editors' tastes. Bierce and Sterling tried for three years to place the poem without result. During those years Sterling continued to refine and expand his fantasy until it grew 207 lines long.

After magazine publication, Sterling slightly revised "A Wine of Wizardry" for book publication, making four punctuation changes, altering four words, and, most noticeably, prefacing his long poem with a three-line quotation from Bierce's poem "Geotheos." When Sterling prepared "A Wine of Wizardry" for his 1923 book Selected Poems, he made eleven more revisions, resulting in three slightly different versions of "A Wine of Wizardry."

== Structure and synopsis ==
Sterling described "A Wine of Wizardry" to Ambrose Bierce: "You'll notice that it's a 'Study in Scarlet,' so to speak, the 'key note' of the whole thing being given in the first four lines. Of course port suggests crimson, poison, vials, red stars, rubies, etc." Sterling said his poem was a procession of pictures, once calling it "that series of red magic-lantern slides." He wrote his poem with a simple, pounding iambic pentameter rhythm. (A century later that rhythm propels rap and hip hop beats.)

The summary below is based on the text of Sterling's 1923 final version in Selected Poems. Spaces between paragraphs show where Sterling placed blank lines to divide his poem.

"A Wine of Wizardry" begins with an unnamed narrator facing west to watch a crimson sunset redden sea-waves crashing on rocks. He pours port wine "Into a crystal cup" but does not yet drink. Instead the narrator stares at his wine and wineglass as if they were a fortune-teller's crystal ball. He envisions a winged woman named Fancy flying to beautiful places and horrifying sites, all imagined as red from seeing them in the dark wine and the sunset-reflecting wineglass. First Fancy flies to a beach where maidens dodge waves or search for sea-moss and seashells. Then Fancy goes to a red grotto with "wattled monsters" and a "magician peering on the dammed". Next Fancy goes to an iceberg beneath the northern lights, "where arctic elves have hidden wintry gems". Looking for warmth, Fancy travels to stars in space.

Then she visits a garden near shadowy towers and a forest where fairies dance for elves. Fancy leaves for a "Syrian treasure-house," then follows "the seaward flight of homing dragons" "To some red city of the Djinns" where silent palaces with "a porphyry crypt" make her flee South. There "crafty gnomes with scarlet eyes" plan to extinguish the red star Aldebaran. The gnomes live in a cavern "Above a wicked queen's unhallowed tomb." Inside her tomb, statues of monsters hold globes, rubies glow, tree roots thrust into marble, and royal helmets rust. Outside, cypress trees reflect the sun's ghostly red, a flying bat sees "the twilight witch", and the king of "silent ghouls" excavates black relics. Frightened, Fancy flies to a narrow strip of land projecting from a western coast into the sea. Underwater she finds colorful coral and rocks. On orange sand, bronze-prowed galleys with sailors from far shores stare at the setting sun as if it was a red lighthouse beacon. Waves wash over the ships' decks "And crimson bubbles rise from battle-wrecks." Luminous polyps swim to glowing underwater caves.

Fancy follows the red star Antares in the constellation Scorpio to an island with temples, where she smiles at priestesses in purple robes holding garnets up to the sun or shouting "a mystic word" to the red star Betelgeuse. She flies to groves of trees where a cathedral wall is draped with hyacinth flowers. Inside the dark cathedral, before Faith returns, Fancy kneels to quietly commemorate the day. She leaves to watch a mountain with broken tombs. She knows Circe and her poisons are there, and sees Circe brew potions, torture a victim, and smile, until "shapes of men that were / Point, weeping, at tremendous dooms to be."

Fancy flees again, this time to caverns where Satan fondles a flayed victim before Lilith "leads from Hell his whitest queens" wearing only chains heated red-hot. The queens dance in pain. Fancy leaves for a place where "powers of wizardry" search for objects and "A sick enchantress" curses the stars.

Fancy flees to India's river Ganges and a temple of Siva lit with funeral pyres. She leaves Asia and travels to halls where "dead Merlin's prowling ape has spilt" a vial of scarlet venom. A spell invokes a phantom who cries and makes an owl sad. The goddess Hecate speaks a menacing spell. Fancy sees a blue-eyed vampire smile in front of the crater-pocked moon, which reminds the narrator of leprosy sores.

Fancy folds her wings and flees to a star visible above the last fadeout of sunset. Sterling's narrator looks "the way she went". Returned from imagination to the real world, the narrator, in the poem's final line, at last drinks from his wineglass. He smiles.

== Magazine publication ==
In April 1907 the New York Times and the Washington Post printed a lengthy interview with the new British ambassador, James Bryce. The news media focused on Bryce's remark that America lacked great poets. The story was reprinted by other newspapers, and Bryce's remark was reported and mocked in newspapers and magazines across the nation. Ambrose Bierce wrote a monthly column in William Randolph Hearst's magazine Cosmopolitan. In May, Cosmopolitan's new editor Samuel Selwyn Chamberlain noticed that Bierce's column mentioned Ambassador Bryce: "Mr. Bryce, the venerable British ambassador, is pleased to lament the fact that America has no great poets. Mr. Bryce has the distinction to be ignorant, or he is inaccessible to poetry. In Mr. George Sterling and Mr. William Vaughn Moody we have two young poets of a high order of genius who have 'arrived,' and others are on the way. ... In 'The Testimony of the Suns' Mr. Sterling strikes and holds as high a note as has been heard in a century of English song, and I have a manuscript poem by him which would add to the glory of Coleridge or Keats."

Chamberlain asked Bierce to see Sterling's "manuscript poem", so Bierce sent him "A Wine of Wizardry." In June 1907, Chamberlain told Bierce he would publish "A Wine of Wizardry" and Bierce's companion essay, "A Poet and His Poem" in Cosmopolitan.

The Hearst company splashed large advertisements in newspapers across the country promoting its new issue of Cosmopolitan. Sterling's poem was not the advertisements' most prominent item, but because Chamberlain could tie "A Wine of Wizardry" to the headline-generating Bryce controversy, the poem rated its own boldface subhead "Ambassador Bryce Challenged by a New American Poet," followed by this text, which does not mention Sterling:

"James Bryce, author of The American Commonwealth, implied the other day that this country lacks poets. In September Cosmopolitan appears a new poem which is a complete refutation of Mr. Bryce's opinion. 'A Wine of Wizardry' is declared by no less a critic than Ambrose Bierce to be the greatest poem since the days of Shelley and Keats."

It was followed the next day by a larger half-page advertisement with a different lead item but the same "Wine of Wizardry" subhead and text.

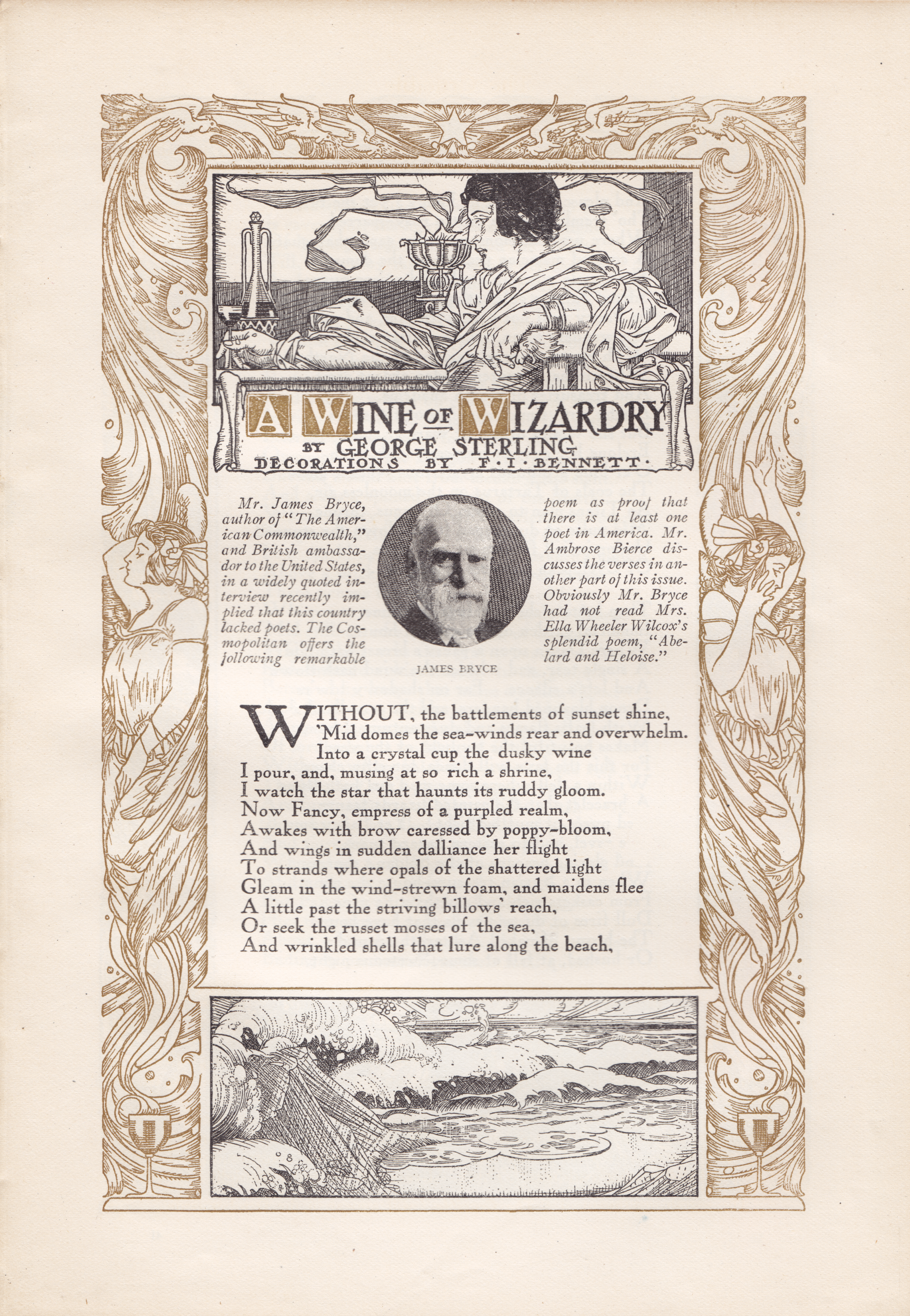
First page of George Sterling's "A Wine of Wizardry" in Sept. 1907 Cosmopolitan magazine

Then (as now) monthly magazines arrived at newsstands and in subscriber mailboxes the month before their cover dates, so the September 1907 issue of Hearst's Cosmopolitan magazine arrived in mid-August, containing both Sterling's six-page "A Wine of Wizardry" with illustrations, followed by Bierce's afterword about Sterling and his poem. The first page of the poem featured a photograph not of Sterling nor of Bierce but of James Bryce, with a preface by Chamberlain that tied "A Wine of Wizardry" to the Bryce controversy: "Mr. James Bryce, author of The American Commonwealth, and British ambassador to the United States, in a widely quoted interview recently implied that this country lacked poets. The Cosmopolitan offers the following remarkable poem as proof that there is at least one poet in America. Mr. Ambrose Bierce discusses the verses in another part of this issue. Obviously Mr. Bryce had not read Mrs. Ella Wheeler Wilcox's splendid poem, 'Abelard and Heloise'."

== Critical controversy ==
Neither Sterling nor Bierce imagined the tumult that followed. Sterling found himself at the center of a coast-to-coast media firestorm, one of the most-praised, most-condemned, most-parodied poets in America. Part of the uproar was caused by Sterling's somewhat difficult-to-understand poem. However, most of the controversy was caused by Bierce's opinionated and (for many readers) infuriating afterword, plus the efforts of William Randolph Hearst's media empire to rouse an uproar to sell newspapers and magazines. Over the next five months, Americans were bombarded with newspaper stories, magazine articles, jokes, cartoons, and even preachers' sermons attacking or defending Sterling, Bierce, and the poem.

The first voice to support Sterling was Bierce, in that same issue of Cosmopolitan. Bierce's three-page afterword to "A Wine of Wizardry" appeared nineteen pages after Sterling's poem. Titled "A Poet and His Poem," the afterword highly praised Sterling and his earlier poem "The Testimony of the Suns" before discussing "A Wine of Wizardry." Unfortunately, Bierce used phrases that led readers to think "A Wine of Wizardry" was Sterling's first poem—which it was not—and when Bierce praised "The Testimony of the Suns" by saying "Of that work I have the temerity to think that in both subject and art it nicks the rock as high as anything of the generation of Tennyson, and a good deal higher than anything of the generation of Kipling ... ," the vagueness of Bierce's terms "that work" and "it" led readers to erroneously assume he was not praising "Testimony" but "A Wine of Wizardry." Readers also misunderstood Bierce when he acclaimed Sterling by saying "Yet I steadfastly believe and hardily affirm that George Sterling is a very great poet—incomparably the greatest that we have on this side of the Atlantic." Bierce wrote "is" and "have", using present tense to indicate he thought Sterling was the greatest current or greatest living poet in America, not the greatest American poet ever. Many uncareful readers assumed Bierce meant the "greatest poet ever in America." Adding the word "current" or "living" would have reduced the bitter vitriol caused by that single unclear sentence.

The first widely-read attack on Bierce and "A Wine of Wizardry" was a lengthy editorial in Hearst's New York Evening Journal by Hearst executive Arthur Brisbane. Brisbane's attack was reprinted in Hearst papers from coast to coast, and was syndicated to non-Hearst newspapers. He began by endorsing the September issue of Cosmopolitan which contained Sterling's poem. Then he misquoted Bierce:

Ambrose Bierce is one of the best writers in America, perhaps the best. And he ought to be a good judge. He says positively that this poem which the Cosmopolitan prints is THE BEST POEM THAT HAS EVER BEEN WRITTEN IN AMERICA.

Next Brisbane again misquoted Bierce, then attacked "A Wine of Wizardry" with sarcasm:

Meanwhile, here are sample lines from the poem which, Ambrose Bierce and the Cosmopolitan Magazine tell us, is the greatest that has ever been written in America:

A cowled Magician peering on the damned
Thro' vials wherein a splendid poison burns.

That sounds heavy and fine. What is YOUR opinion; is it POETRY? [...] Here is a quotation, terrific, dreadful in the picture that it presents to the mind:

And Satan, yawning on his brazen seat,
Fondles a screaming thing his fiends have flayed.

There is nothing the matter with the imagination of Mr. Sterling or any other "poet" able to see in his mind's eye Satan "fondling" a living, screaming thing from which the hide has been stripped. Again we ask you to use YOUR OWN JUDGMENT. Is that POETRY, and if not, WHAT is it?
Here is another picture that might disturb little children in their sleep:

The blue-eyed vampire, sated at her feast,
Smiles bloodily against the leprous moon.

A blue-eyed vampire, tired of drinking blood, smiling bloodily at a leprous moon—could any but the greatest poet that America has produced conceive this picture?

Brisbane did not mention James Bryce. His widely quoted article shifted attention away from the relatively small controversy over Bryce to what quickly became a bigger battle over Bierce, Sterling, and "A Wine of Wizardry." Sterling later said, "Brisbane told a friend of mine that one newsstand sold 600 Cosmopolitans the day after his first editorial appeared."

After Brisbane's piece, newspapers and magazines around the country published scores of articles, humor, and letters to the editors for the next five months. Here are excerpts from three letters in one day's New York Evening Journal:

- Frances W. Halsey: "As descriptive verse, the poem is well above the average and well entitled to the decorative border given it by its publisher. The poet is unquestionably a magician in words; but there have been others before his time whose work did not last."
- W. J. Hanna: "It is instinct with a weird and rosy and gorgeous imagery. It reeks of the vague. It is a parterre of exotics which wooes the senses, not a banyan of the forest affording rest and strength to men, although here and there is an oasis green and unadorned."
- Widden Guaham: "The poem is punk. Bierce's puff of it is rot. There are not two lines of true poetry in the poem. I believe the whole thing is a joke—that Mr. Bierce is having fun with the fool people who accept as poetry what some 'literary person' tells them they ought to admire. If Mr. Bierce is serious then he is a chump."

Respected reporter and book reviewer Hector Fuller gave his opinion in the Washington [D.C.] Herald: "And yet, one feels that Mr. Bierce might be pushed to warrant 'blue-eyed vampire.' Blue-eyed Claribel might seem fitting; or, 'Rare, pale Margaret' might be blue-eyed, but somehow one does not associate blue eyes with a vampire!"

William F. Kirk, a baseball reporter and comic versifier, chimed in: "Mr. Sterling's "A Wine of Wizardry," far from being the greatest poem written in America, is not a great poem at all, and ranks, in everything save adjectives, far below [other] American poems that come to mind as I write." Five days later Kirk rushed into print his parody "A Dream of Dope by Pegasus Piffle."

Jokes were commonplace. The most-often-reprinted wisecrack about the poem: "Charles Frohman told John [W.] Jennings in confidence that five lines of it would drive a man to beat a cripple, and ten lines would send him to the bottom of the river."

Arthur Brisbane persuaded George Brinton McClellan Harvey, the editor of prestigious publications Harper's Weekly and North American Review, to give his opinion of "A Wine of Wizardry." In a lengthy essay Harvey stated: "We are willing to admit at the outset that in the whole range of American or, for that matter, English, poetry there is no example of a poem crowded with such startling imagery, ambitiously marshalled in lines of such lurid impressiveness, all of which at once arrest attention and would bewilder the aesthetic sensibility of a Titan," but he concluded: "The poem has no merit. It begins nowhere, follows no path and ends where it began—a mere congeries of gobs, as far removed from the play of true poetic fancy as the odor of hyoscyamus from the fragrance of a rose."

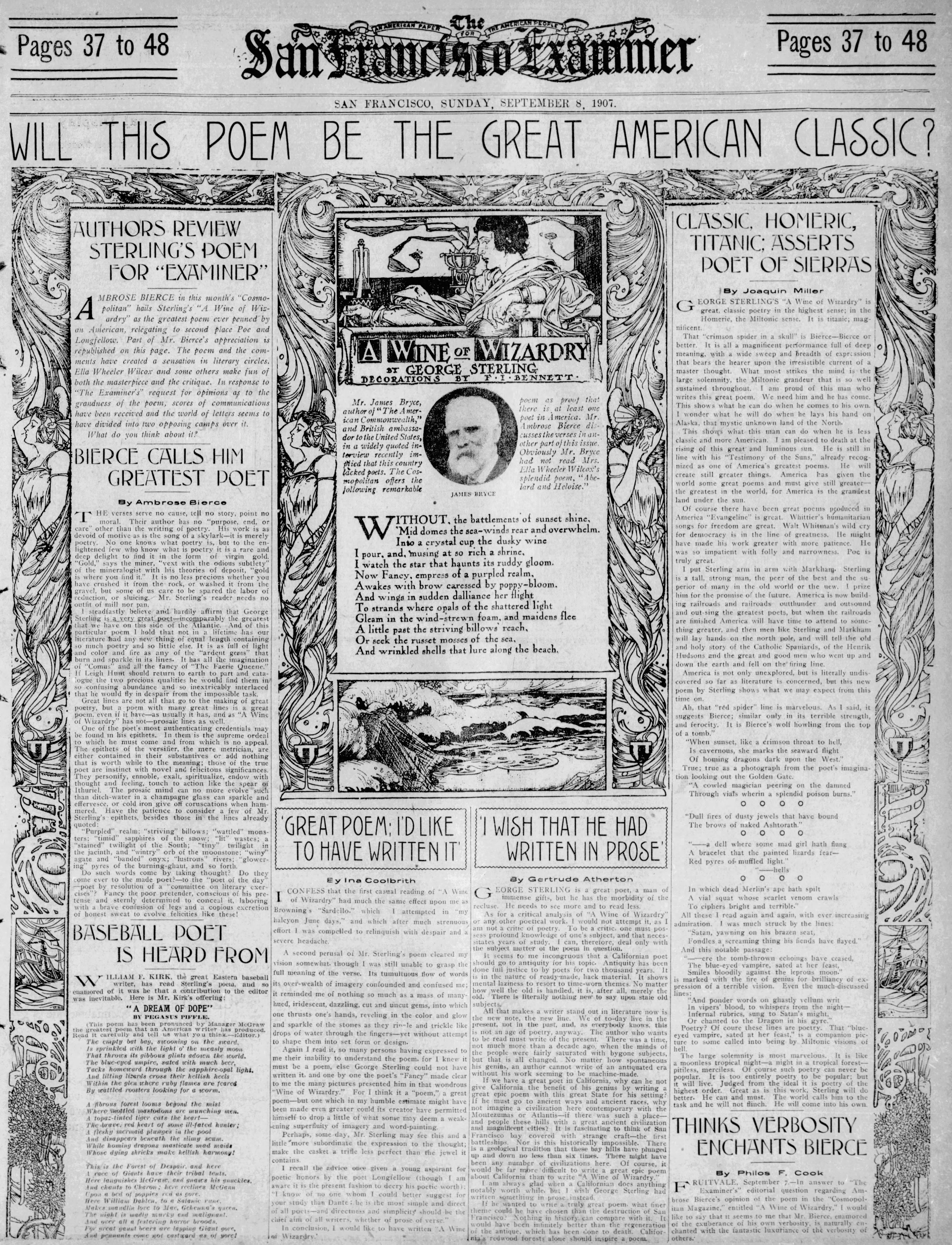
Sept. 8, 1907 San Francisco Examiner full page of reactions to George Sterling's fantasy poem "A Wine of Wizardry"

On September 8, Hearst's San Francisco Examiner ran an entire page about "A Wine of Wizardry," headlined "Will This Poem Be the Great American Classic?" An anonymous editor prefaced the page by repeating the misinformation that Bierce claimed "A Wine of Wizardry" was "the greatest poem ever penned by an American." This was followed by excerpts from Bierce's Cosmopolitan essay "A Poet and His Poem," "baseball writer" William F. Kirk's parody poem "A Dream of Dope," and four reviews by poet Ina Coolbrith, novelist Gertrude Atherton, poet Joaquin Miller, and the otherwise unheard-of Philos F. Cook. These reviews were reprinted and excerpted by other newspapers. The page reproduced the Cosmopolitan page with the first thirteen lines of Sterling's 207-line poem, Samuel Selwyn Chamberlain's preface, Francis I. Bennett's illustrations, and the photograph of James Bryce. Nothing on the newspaper page told readers that the thirteen lines were just the poem's beginning; many readers assumed they were the entire poem.

The Washington Post stated: "Other poems dealing with creeping and crawling things have had their value—if they have lived—in something more than the recapitulation of repulsive objects in various colors."

Sterling complained to his best friend Jack London, "Of course I realize that Hearst is doing all this merely to sell his damned Cosmopolitan, but it doesn't make the whole row any the less absurd and offensive to me. It's as though he had launched a drove of swine into my big sitting room, or had dumped a can of sea-sick vomit on my head. Ambrose is preserving a terrified silence, filled doubtless with horror at the thought of what he had made me incur."

In Oakland, California, an anti-witchcraft crusader told the mayor there were "witches in the City Hall" and declared: "We have got to get to the root of this evil. I am satisfied, sir, that this "Wine of Wizardry" is the cause of it all. ...I desire you to exercise great caution and be very careful and not have any witches shot. They must be burned or hung."

In the New York Evening Journal, Arthur Brisbane reported that the issue of Cosmopolitan containing "A Wine of Wizardry" had sold out and the newspaper had received "many hundreds of letters" arguing over the poem.

The San Francisco News Letter and California Advertiser approved the poem but not Bierce's heavy-handed endorsement: "'A Wine of Wizardry' is a great poem, one of the greatest produced in recent years, perhaps, and most of us would have made that discovery without having the fact bludgeoned into us by Mr. Bierce."

Sterling described his own point of view in news magazine Town Talk: "I think there is room in the garden of poetry for all kinds of flowers, and we shouldn't allow narrow minds to cast from it everything that's not a rose, a lily or a violet. Perhaps that series of red magic-lantern slides that I call 'A Wine of Wizardry' can best be compared, in the above metaphor, to a collection of queer red orchids."

The Los Angeles Times disagreed: "The poet is George Sterling, and the poem purports to describe the things he saw after drinking a cup of wine. [Actually, the visions were seen not by Sterling, but by his unnamed narrator. And the narrator did not sip the wine before his visions but drank only after the visions ended.] It was a potent drink that produced such an attack of delirium tremens. I once knew a man who had 'em for fair, and wandered three days in the desert, chasing green-haired ballet girls in pink tights and combing snakes out of his whiskers, but he never saw anything to compare with the circus procession that passed before Mr. Sterling. He would give his shirt for three fingers of the jag-juice mentioned by Mr. Sterling and recommended so highly by Mr. Bierce."

In the October 1907 issue of Humanity, Edwin C. Ranck covered the entire controversy in a caustic article beginning:

The most amusing thing in recent literary annals is Ambrose Bierce's grandiloquent praise of George Sterling's new poem, "A Wine of Wizardry," and the jealous, bitter reply made to it by that empress of scullery maid's poetry—Ella Wheeler Wilcox. There are so many funny incidents connected with this "tempest in a teapot" that one does not know when to laugh first. It is like a continuous vaudeville performance.

The October Current Literature covered the controversy by reprinting "A Wine of Wizardry" and an introduction indicating its editor's displeasure: "The poem is a series of lurid pictures which Fancy, wine-inspired, is represented as conjuring up. There is practically no thought-content. It is full of vivid color and the word-painting is remarkable; but there is no appeal to the intellect, nor, with us at least, to the emotions. It is a kaleidoscope, and one feels that the series of pictures could be continued indefinitely, no one of them having any organic relation to any other."

A writer in Little Devil magazine spouted a five-page tirade with the verdict: "A sane man, after a perusal of the 'Wine of Wizardry' and the encomiums of Bierce has no alternative but to conclude that Bierce is excited with hop and Sterling is ripe for a Keel[e]y cure."

In the December Cosmopolitan, Bierce fired back with an entertaining, angry diatribe, "An Insurrection of the Peasantry." Bierce targeted ten critics. He named three from the Examiner's September full page about "A Wine of Wizardry": Gertrude Atherton, Joaquin Miller, and Ina Coolbrith—who all knew Sterling personally. Bierce gave nicknames to his other seven targets: the "Baseball Reporter" (William F. Kirk), the "Sweet Slinger of Slang" (possibly William J. Lampton, called "the Slang Poet" in Bierce's poem "A Poet's Hope"), the "Simian Lexicographer of Misinformation" (Wex Jones), the "Queen of Platitudinaria" (Ella Wheeler Wilcox), "Deacon Harvey" (George Harvey), "A person of light and leading in their bright band" (Arthur Brisbane), and "the critic, who, naturally, is a book-reviewer" (Hector Fuller). Bierce railed mostly against Brisbane, as the attacks' chief instigator, and Harvey, whom Bierce called "a person of note and consequence. ... Moreover, he has a notable knack at mastery of the English language, which he handles with no small part of the ease and grace that may have distinguished the impenitent thief carrying his cross up the slope of Calvary."

Near the end of December, sportswriter Grantland Rice used baseball jargon to sum up Bierce's quarrels with Sterling detractors: "The highest batting average among the ranks of the litterateruri, or words to that effect, belongs to Ambrose Bierce, of the Cosmopolitan. Mr. Bierce was the original gent who proclaimed George Sterling's poem, 'A Wine of Wizardry,' the greatest piece of American verse. Ella Wheeler Wilcox immediately arose and opined that Mr. Bierce had mud on his skylight. Whereupon the enraged critic comes back with a statement, terming her 'the poetess who has given up the sin-and-sugar of youth for the milk-and-morality of old age.' If this isn't hitting 'em out [of the ballpark], we miss an easy guess."

== Book publication ==
Publicity about "A Wine of Wizardry" drove book publishers to Sterling, eager to turn his notorious poem into a book. Sterling instead sold book rights to San Francisco bookstore owner Alexander Robertson's tiny company. Sterling was grateful because after the 1906 San Francisco earthquake and fire destroyed Robertson's business and burned the second edition of Sterling's The Testimony of the Suns and Other Poems, Robinson took a chance on Sterling and printed a third edition. Also important to Sterling was that Robinson gave him approval of all advertising. Sterling hated marketing text and testimonial quotations. He thought them undignified, called them "booming", and refused to allow Robertson to use them to promote his books.

To fill his "A Wine of Wizardry" book, George added 34 shorter poems and his play The Triumph of Bohemia. He included a dedication page: "To my uncle Frank C. Havens Oakland, California".

Due to post-earthquake financial troubles, Alexander Robertson took a year to publish A Wine of Wizardry and Other Poems. He bound the book in a dark red cloth. The front cover title and author name were stamped in gold. Between them was a small drawing by Sterling's friend Herman George Scheffauer of an overflowing wine glass on a rock with a circle of flames around it. The drawing appeared on the red front cover only for the book's first state, the first copies bound. Although the book's title page says "1909," it was copyrighted in 1908 and for sale in bookstores in mid-December 1908.

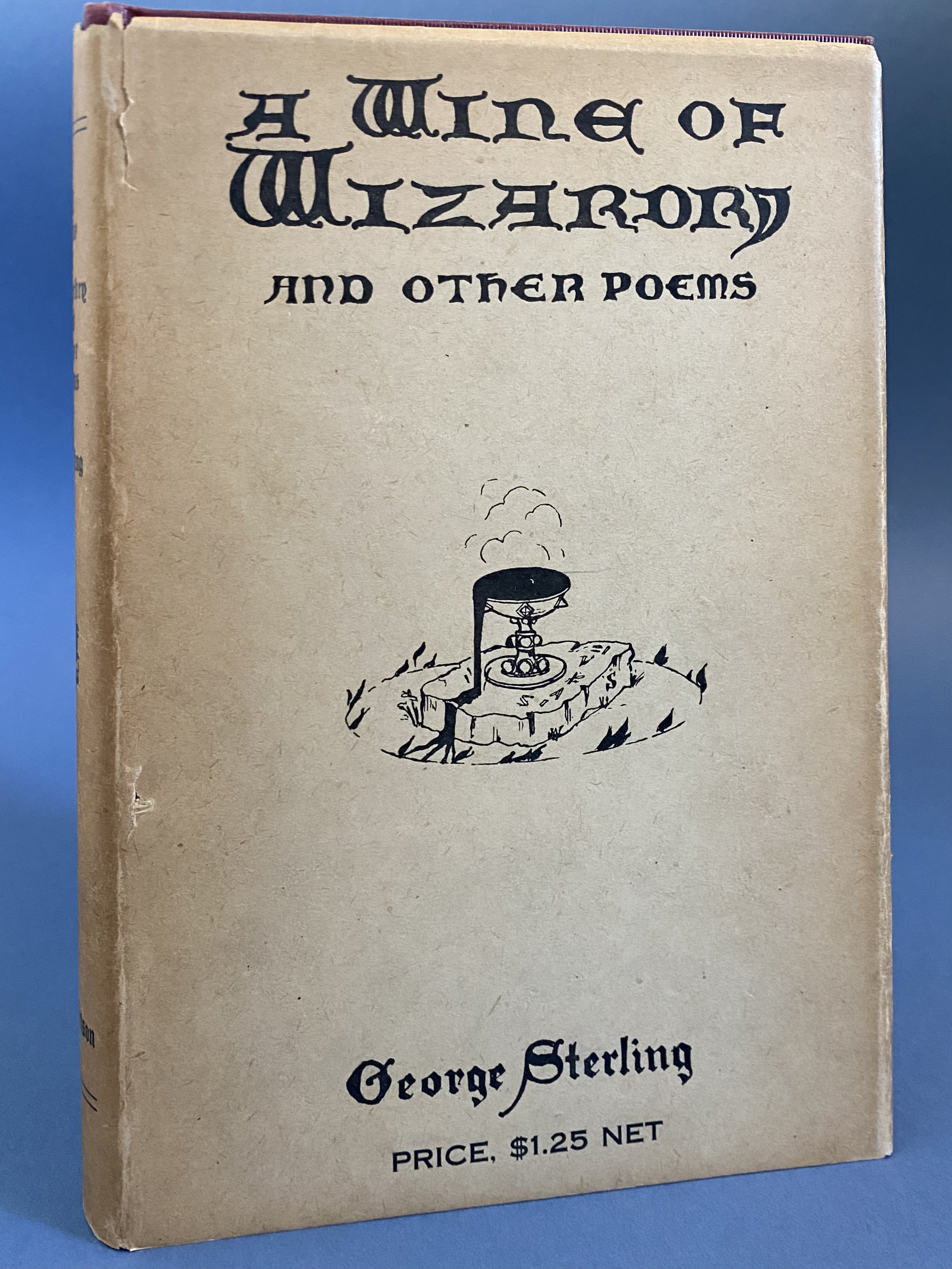
1908 dust jacket of A Wine of Wizardry and Other Poems

Scheffauer's small drawing of an overflowing wineglass also appeared on the dust jacket of A Wine of Wizardry and Other Poems. Otherwise the dust jacket included only the book title, author name, and price—no reason persuading a reader to buy the book, and no quotes from critics—even though "A Wine of Wizardry" had generated some glowing reviews. Robertson ran small advertisements in magazines and newspapers for the book; Sterling policed those ads to ensure they also lacked quotes or marketing text. Robertson sent between 100 and 200 copies of the book to reviewers. The critics responded with opinions both favorable and unfavorable.

== Book's critical reception ==
Many book reviewers, before giving their opinions of the rest of the book, first debated Sterling's infamous title poem. Hearst's newspaper the New York American said: "The [sic] Wine of Wizardry" can scarcely be called a poem. It does not seem to me to have the organic unity essential to every work of art. Mr. Sterling gives us the words, the images and the fine lines; but they are not fused into a living whole." The Chicago Tribune commented that "A Wine of Wizardry": "has received great praise in more than one quarter, but the present writer confesses—with some trepidation—to being quite confused and overwhelmed by it. It seems to suggest one of those dreadful Chinese parades, with too much dragon, too much music, too much glitter. It is a vision produced by the mixing—and one presumes, the drinking—of a wizard wine, and it seems to be most incontinently cursed with adjectives." The Boston Evening Transcript commented that the "Wizardry" poem: "has in it lines that are strikingly and strongly imaginative as well as others which are as strikingly and strongly ridiculous. ... Indeed, long discussion of the poem is nearly all wasted, inasmuch as everybody who reads this highly fantastic piece will adopt his own individual attitude regarding it. And certainly the poem has enough contrasting material to give everybody ample opportunity to adopt his own point of view." The Chicago Post summarized its point of view: "In regard to the performance which gives title to this volume, it is most charitable to be silent."

Critics disagreed about the remainder of Sterling's book. The Boston Evening Transcript said: "Nothing especially unusual or distinctive can be found in the remaining poems of the volume, although Mr. Sterling not infrequently writes delicately and gracefully." The Brooklyn Daily Eagle singled out Sterling's fantasy play The Triumph of Bohemia as "finely conceived and ably executed. It must have been received with special delight," but said of the book overall, "The poems are good, but not commanding: the[y] are only for the brief passing day." On the other hand, after singling out several individual poems for praise, the New York American concluded that: "... we need have no doubt as to one thing—that a new poet has arrived, a poet with fine imaginative powers. Let us welcome him today, and not defer his laudation till the wild poppies are nodding above his grave." The Westminster Review was not as enthusiastic: "Taken as a whole, the collection scarcely rises above the level of minor verse."

== Later criticism of the poem ==
In the years immediately after the book's publication, the poem continued to receive mentions in magazines, books, and newspapers, but not as the main subject of essays and reviews, only as sections of profiles of Sterling or reviews of books. For example, in the Literary Digest review of Sterling's next book The House of Orchids and Other Poems, poet Joyce Kilmer enthused: "By writing '[A] Wine of Wizardry' and 'The Black Vulture,' George Sterling earned the gratitude of all lovers of poetry." In 1916, Harriet Monroe, the editor of Poetry, reviewed Sterling's book Beyond the Breakers and Other Poems. She took a shot at "A Wine of Wizardry" and its protagonist Fancy: "'A Wine of Wizardry' leaves me cold. ... In fact, I cannot follow the poor lady's meanderings through a maze of words." A brief item in the New York Times said: "It is a poem remarkable for its imaginative power and the grisly pictures it gives such as: 'A shrieking ghost that fiends have flayed'."

In his book California the Wonderful, poet Edwin Markham devoted four pages to Sterling. He said that in "'The [sic] Wine of Wizardry," which took our hearts with its strange beauty, Mr. Sterling shows his feeling for color and luster of phrase and line ..." before stating: "Mr. Sterling's "Wine of Wizardry" raised in the literary world the question, 'Is it a great poem?' The chief difficulty in answering this question lies in the fact that 'The [sic] Wine of Wizardry' can scarcely be called a poem." After giving his reasons why he thought "Wine" is not a poem, Markham concluded: "It may be that Mr. Sterling intended to give us only a series of weird pictures. If so, he has made a remarkable success. As you read his wizard pages, you feel as though you were voyaging up some tropic stream darkened with excess of foliage and bloom, where through the rifts in the leafy roofs you get glimpses of a blazing sky, or catch at times the iris flash of giant flowers or brilliant birds, the gleam of jeweled lizards or the coil of coruscating serpents. Considered as a series of gorgeous dissolving views, "The [sic] Wine of Wizardry" is unequaled by anything else in our literature: it stands alone, a marvel of color and verbal beauty."

Seventeen days before Sterling committed suicide, he revealed his feelings about the ongoing criticism in a Halloween 1926 letter to Clark Ashton Smith. Sterling said he found it: "... disquieting to observe that the whole intellectual (including of course the esthetic) trend is increasingly against admiration of the daemonic, the supernatural. Such elements now seem only to awaken smiles, as being childish in their nature and no part of the future vision of the race. I regret that this should be so, for it implies that I've wasted a good deal of creative energy; but only cranks and mental hermits now take my 'Wine' seriously, and I feel futile when I use my imagination on 'impossible' stuff, the element where it is best fitted to function. Maybe we'll have anarchy in America, some day, with the accompanying reversion to racial childhood. That will come too late for me, but perhaps not for you. For the present, my 'blue-eyed vampire' is only an intellectual joke, and to call anyone a fool who smiles back at her is not to win the argument."

=== After Sterling's suicide ===
After Sterling's death, several summaries of his life mentioned his wine poem. Critic and editor H. L. Mencken said: "I think his dramatic poem Lilith was the greatest thing he ever wrote, although his poetic work "A Wine of Wizardry" also was wonderful." Reporter Carey McWilliams wrote: "'A Wine of Wizardry' is perhaps the most famous poem ever written by a western poet. ...The poem itself, read today, resembles nothing so much as a series of red lantern slides, a necklace of dazzling and amazing gems. A gorgeous display, unbelievably rich in imagery and imaginative splendor, but ... divorced of feeling, [and] sterile of rapture ..."

Clark Ashton Smith, in a postmortem appreciation of his mentor Sterling, recalled how "touched with more than the glamour of childhood dreams, was my first reading, [at age 15], of "A Wine of Wizardry" in the pages of the old Cosmopolitan. The poem, with its necromantic music, and splendors as of sunset on jewels and cathedral windows, was veritably all that its title implied; and—to pile marvel upon enchantment—there was the knowledge that it had been written in my own time, by someone who lived little more than a hundred miles away. In the ruck of magazine verse it was a fire-opal of the Titans in a potato bin ..."

In Oregon, one newspaper editor thought the best memorial to the deceased Sterling would be a reprint of his entire wine poem. The long poem filled half a large newspaper page. The editor explained Sterling "was, undoubtedly, a poetic genius of the first order, and in all English verse there is no more glowing example of the sheer beauty of phrase, of the glory and sorcery of language, than is discovered in 'A Wine of Wizardry' ... it is desirable, apart from the testimony of news accounts, that there should be a more general comprehension of the literary worth of George Sterling, who in this poem reached his zenith."

=== Late twentieth century criticism ===
After 1926, "A Wine of Wizardry" went out of print for thirty-eight years, except for one 1948 appearance in the fanzine Fantasy Commentator with four full-page illustrations by Joseph Kruchner. The poem was reprinted in 1964 in a 120-copy limited edition with an introduction by historian Dale L. Walker stating: "... to the devotee of the weird and macabre, to the visionary, the dreamer, and the admirer of colorful writing, bookstalls are still scoured for the volume containing this unusual poem. Quite possibly there is no middle road in judging this poem. One either likes it very much or not at all."

Fantasy author Fritz Leiber wrote: "It's a grand compilation of eerie scenes and weird legends--a panorama of fantasy, particularly fantasy tinged with supernatural horror in the manner of Coleridge's 'Kubla Khan," which to my mind it equals. The poem is a catalogue of shivery and often ghoulish wonders, and in showing by his colorful imagery that these have a wild theatrical beauty, Sterling makes a genuine achievement."

In 1969, Charles Angoff, president of the Poetry Society of America, included "A Wine of Wizardry" in the Society's book George Sterling: A Centenary Memoir-Anthology to celebrate the hundredth anniversary of Sterling's birth.

In 1971, the poem was published in a mass-market paperback for the first time, in New Worlds for Old, edited by Lin Carter. In a preface to the poem, Carter said of Sterling: "The modern poets have long ago left behind those appurtenances at which he excelled——verbal music, rhyme, jeweled coloring," and discussed Sterling's relationship with Clark Ashton Smith.

In 1977, Professor Arthur Chandler reprinted the "A Wine of Wizardry" in his book Old Tales of San Francisco, commenting: '"The [sic] Wine of Wizardry' gives us the best of Sterling's consummate handling of rhyme and meter and his skill in conjuring up exotic fantasies from the semiconscious mind."

Poet and critic Donald Sidney-Fryer described in 1977 how "A Wine of Wizardry" both reflected Ambrose Bierce's poetic preferences and influenced the works of Clark Ashton Smith: "Not only is Sterling's imagery in "A Wine of Wizardry" admirably concentrated but the poem itself, in structural terms, is an uncompromising concentration of such imagery developed on the foundation of a simple narrative: this is a direct application of Bierce's principal theory in the realm of poetics. Since Bierce considered imagery (and/or imagination) to be the heart, the soul, the essence of poetry—for him the imagery was the poetry—then in theory a poem successfully constructed on this model would be the most poetic possible, that is, the most imaginative. ...But far more than the technique of compressing imagery upon the foundation of a simple narrative is the Sterlingesque technique par excellence (developed concomitantly along with the previous one) of suggesting or intimating eerie and/or exotic adventures through the series of episodes projected through the imagery. This is the technique that Sterling's protégé Ashton Smith was to imitate, master, and apply over and over again in virtually every collection of his poetry ..."

In his 1980 book George Sterling, Thomas Benediktsson classified Sterling as "an American Decadent," and described 'A Wine of Wizardry' as a poem in which "nearly every characteristic of Decadence can be found: the search for novelty, the interest in the exotic and the unnatural, the aesthetic assumption that poetry is a means of enchantment, with a concurrent emphasis on language as an evocative and connotative instrument, the rhetorical ornamentation (resulting at times in a disintegration of artistic unity), the scorn of contemporary society, and the many allusions to an exotic past. ... Sterling's shift to Decadence is very evident in the playful perversity of 'A Wine of Wizardry,' the poem which made him famous. In this long lyric, the dominant aesthetic principle seems to be that poetry is an exquisitely useless activity whose main function is to invoke extremes of sensation. The odd detachment of the poem would suggest that this is a rather effete sort of experimentation; yet the highly mannered language seems like a fabric stretched over an abyss of despair, hidden from the reader's view only by the gaudiness of that fabric."

Professor Tony J. Stafford, in a carefully considered essay "George Sterling and the Wine of Fancy," looked back at "A Wine of Wizardry" from a different perspective to explain the earlier critical confusion and describe what Sterling accomplished, as these two paragraphs show:

"Contrary to contemporary opinion, including Bierce's, the poem is not a mere verbal and imagistic orgy, but a carefully controlled work of art. Its subject is the imagination, its purpose to define its power, but the definition process is subtle and complex. The poem is basically a vision of flight, induced by a sunset and a glass of wine into which the sun shines. The agent of the vision is the imagination, and the quality of the vision bespeaks imagination's power. The purpose also determines the nature of the parts, the structure, the imagery, the sound, and the atmosphere, and by their characteristics contribute to the definition. This unity of purpose, content, and technique gives the poem an integrated wholeness seemingly unnoticed by its early critics."

"The organic wholeness of "A Wine of Wizardry" is achieved in one final way. As a definition of the power of imagination, the poem itself is a demonstration and demands simultaneously of the reader the active involvement of his imagination. Its final unity is realized by embracing the reader's imagination, and the statements it makes about Fancy must be proved by the reader's utilization of these qualities. If the reader faults in engaging his own imagination, the truth of the poem is destroyed, its final unity remains unachieved, and the poem fails. Thus the cause of the poem's failure in its own day becomes clear; it was not Sterling's fancy which failed, but his readers'. In measuring the imagination, Sterling was accurate in judging its potential, as demonstrated by his poem; he was wrong in assuming the same degree in all poetry readers, as shown by the poem's initial reception."

=== Early twenty-first century criticism ===
In the late twentieth century "A Wine of Wizardry" was reprinted, and in the early twenty-first century reprinted again, culminating in the inclusion of the second version of the poem with notes in the three-volume set of Sterling's Complete Poetry. In 2007, author Geoffrey Dunn commemorated the one-hundredth anniversary of the wine poem's first publication with an article in the San Francisco Chronicle summarizing the controversy over the poem's first appearance.

In "George Sterling's 'A Wine of Wizardry': Romanticism, Decadence, and the Fantastic," Cy Matthews stated that the poem's opening lines evoked "the coast of Carmel on the Monterey Peninsula." Sterling, however, wrote the poem in December 1903 and January 1904, while he and his wife Carrie lived in Piedmont, California, more than a year before they first visited Carmel-by-the-Sea on March 4, 1905. Matthews' concluded that "'A Wine of Wizardry,' then, stands as a monument marking the end of an era in American literature: an era when poets could revel in fantastical whimsey whilst still remaining within the bounds of literary genres. It is a strange and somewhat hollow poem, a burst of wild, unstable imagination, a brief but heady intoxication of the mind. Its final image of Fancy at rest—folding her 'splendid plumes' amidst the gathering darkness of evening ... is the image of a poetry which has run its course. Yet throughout the wanderings of Sterling's lines we can discern the Romantic and Decadent energies which in the following decades would form their own new, albeit less respectable, spaces in both the critical and popular imaginations."

In 2024, Spanish literary historian Ariadna García Carreño translated Sterling's book A Wine of Wizardry and Other Poems into Spanish and discussed the wine poem in her introduction.

In his essay "On 'A Wine of Wizardry'," literary historian and critic S. T. Joshi pointed out the poem's significance for readers today: "The absence of a recognisable 'plot,' and even the relative dearth of philosophical 'meaning' beyond its prodigal wealth of vibrant imagery, are not drawbacks but virtues; for the single-minded 'purpose' of 'A Wine of Wizardry' is to suggest the inexhaustible scope of the human imagination—an imagination that has so frequently been drawn to the evocation of horror, terror, weirdness, and bizarrerie. In that sense, the poem becomes a self-fulfilling justification for the entire realm of weird literature."

== Influence ==
"A Wine of Wizardry" influenced works by many writers. The most influenced was poet and fiction writer Clark Ashton Smith. When he read the wine poem at age 15 in a national magazine (which he later described as "In the ruck of magazine verse it was like finding a fire-opal of the Titans in a potato bin"), Smith decided to become a poet."A Wine of Wizardry" inspired his long 1922 poem "The Hashish-Eater" and several of Smith's other works. Poet Donald Sidney-Fryer, the leading pioneer of Smith scholarship, stated that "'A Wine of Wizardry' clearly prefigure[s] in a generic way the extremely picturesque or pictorial character of many of Smith's typical, far-ranging, and most polished fantasies, his extended poems in prose."

In addition to prose poems, "A Wine of Wizardry" influenced some of Smith's fantasy and horror short stories, the works for which he is best known today. Sidney-Fryer observed, "At least one episode in "A Wine of Wizardry," the one involving Satan and Lilith, lines 155–64, directly anticipates one of the details or episodes near the end of one of Smith's very last stories," the 1953 "Schizoid Creator." Another Smith story, the 1931 "A Necromantic Tale," features Satan, Lilith, and Circe from Sterling's poem. Sidney-Fryer continues: "But it is less in the specific passages and details of "A Wine of Wizardry," and more in the manner of envisioning any fantastic scene or tableau, and of shaping it into words, that we can trace the genuine continuity from the variegated contents of Sterling's second-greatest poem to many scenes and settings in Smith's mature fiction of 1928–38." Any reader overwhelmed by Sterling's fanciful pictures in "A Wine of Wizardry" can turn to Smith's 1935 hurricane of fantastic images "The Dark Eidolon" and see that story's direct descendance from the wine poem. In turn, readers can detect indirect influences of "A Wine of Wizardry" in some works of writers who were influenced by Smith, including Ray Bradbury, Fritz Leiber, Leigh Brackett, Harlan Ellison, George R. R. Martin, and Donald Sidney-Fryer.

Smith was not the only writer inspired by the wine poem. Sterling's friend Henry Anderson Lafler did not imitate the style of "A Wine of Wizardry," but he did use its framing device. Where Sterling's narrator used a glass of port wine for his crystal ball, Lafler's narrator peers at a pearl and sees visions. His poem "The Pearl" paid tribute to deceased poet Nora May French.

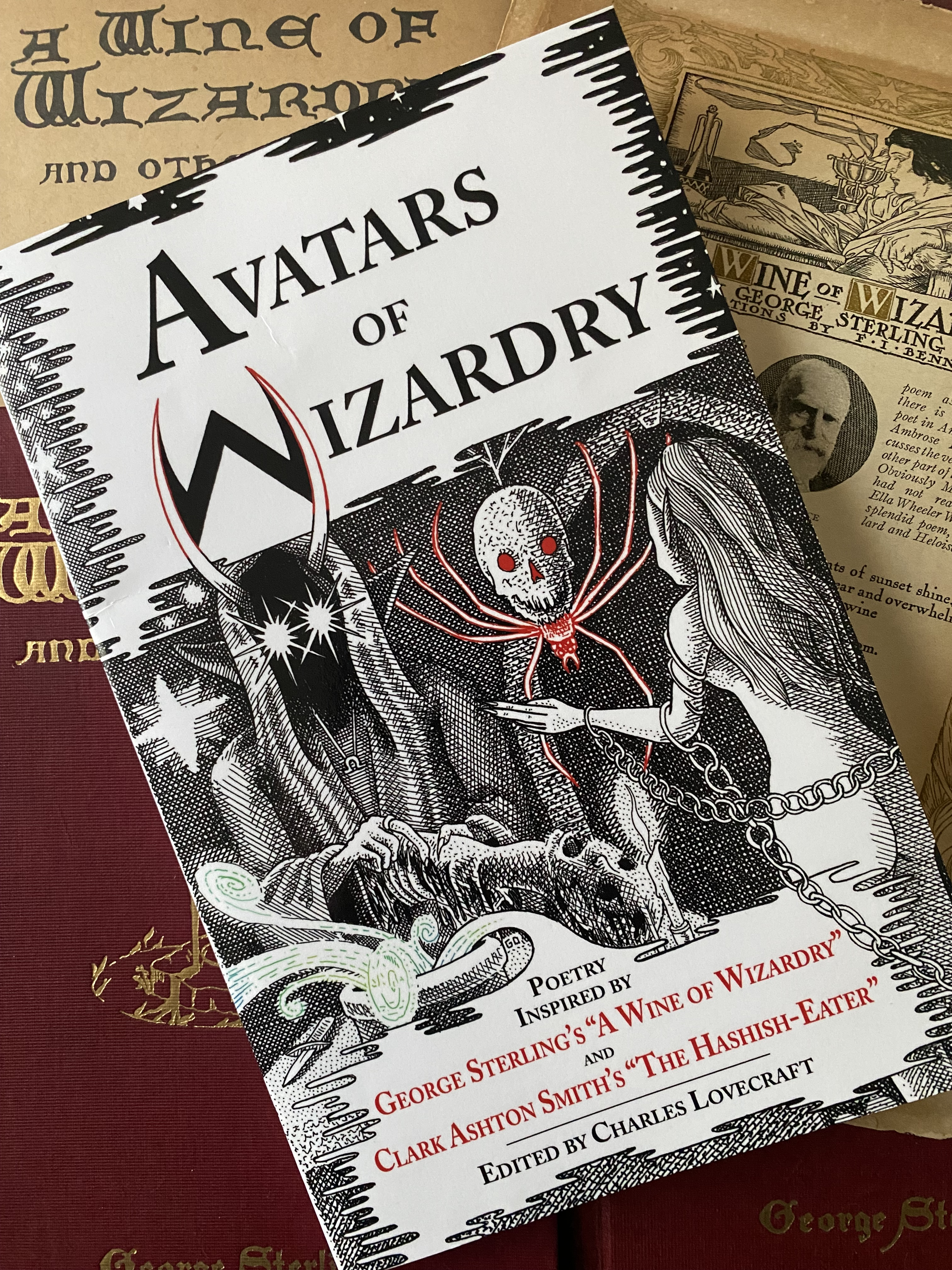
The 2012 book Avatars of Wizardry with earlier 1907-1909 printings of "A Wine of Wizardry" by George Sterling.

Several additional poets wrote other works influenced by "A Wine of Wizardry." In 2012, Australian editor Charles Lovecraft published an entire book of such poems by American, Canadian, and Australian poets: Avatars of Wizardry: Poetry Inspired by George Sterling's "A Wine of Wizardry" and Clark Ashton Smith's "The Hashish-Eater."

Sterling himself, in his later poems, sometimes returned to the style or the structure he employed in "A Wine of Wizardry." The poem's style—a cascade of colorful, fantastical elements—reappears in his "Her Welcome" and "Gardens of the Sea." Sterling re-used the wine poem's structure—a series of pictures—for the two fantasies just named and in one of his most-praised non-fantasy poems, "Autumn in Carmel."

=== Works inspired by "A Wine of Wizardry" ===
All works listed are poems unless noted otherwise.

- Frank Myers, "Our Lady of Spring: A Fantasy" (short story), Lone Hand: The Australian Monthly v. 1 (Oct. 1, 1907), pp. 658–670.
- Paul D. Aros, untitled (first line: "The poet is a man apart,"), Los Angeles Examiner (October 2, 1907), p. 20.
- Jean Louis De Esque, Betelguese: A Trip Through Hell (Jersey City: Connoisseur's Press, 1908).
- Henry Anderson Lafler, "The Pearl," Sunset v. 21 n. 7 (November 1908), pp. 590–593.
- Henry Dumont, "A Golden Fancy," A Golden Fancy and Other Poems (Boston: Chapple Publishing, 1910), pp. 1-4; written January 1909.
- Henry Dumont, "The Vision of a City," A Golden Fancy and Other Poems (Boston: Chapple Publishing, 1910), pp. 7-18; written September 1909.
- George Sterling, "The Gardens of the Sea," Sunset v. 27 n. 1 (July 1911), p. 69.
- George Sterling, "Autumn in Carmel" (originally titled "Memories"), Youth's Companion v. 93 n. 47 (November 20, 1919), p. 656.
- George Sterling, "Her Welcome" written January 19, 1921. Poem first printed in Complete Poetry, pp. 302–303.
- Clark Ashton Smith, "The Hashish-Eater; or, The Apocalypse of Evil," Ebony and Crystal (Auburn, California: Auburn Journal, 1922), pp. 49–64.
- Clarence E. Eddy, "The Devil," Ballads of Heaven and Hell ([Salt Lake City]: [Western Printing Co.], 1922).
- Clark Ashton Smith, "The Necromantic Tale" (short story), Weird Tales v. 17 n. 1 (January 1931), pp. 54–61.
- Clark Ashton Smith, "The Dark Eidolon" (short story), Weird Tales v. 25 n. 1 (January 1935), pp. 93–110.
- Clark Ashton Smith, "Schizoid Creator" (short story), Fantasy Fiction v. 1 n. 4 (November 1953), pp. 78–85.
- Richard L. Tierney, "Visions of Golconda," Savage Menace and Other Poems of Horror (Sydney, Australia: P'rea Press, 2010).
- Leigh Blackmore, "Memoria: A Fragment from the Book of Wyvern," Spores from Sharnoth and Other Madnesses (Sydney, Australia: P'rea Press, 2008; revised printing, 2010).
- Wade German, "The Necromantic Wine," Avatars of Wizardry: Poetry Inspired by George Sterling's "A Wine of Wizardry" and Clark Ashton Smith's "The Hashish-Eater", Charles Lovecraft, ed. (Sydney, Australia: P'rea Press, 2012), pp. 83–91.
- Michael Fantina, "Sandalwood," Avatars of Wizardry, pp. 93–97.
- Kyla Ward, "Lucubration," Avatars of Wizardry, pp. 99–105.
- Ashley Dioses, "Atop the Crystal Moon," Diary of a Sorceress (New York: Hippocampus Press, 2017), pp. 28-37.

=== Parodies of "A Wine of Wizardry" ===
"A Wine of Wizardry" also inspired less-serious homages: parodies. In a way, a parody of a poem pays tribute to it. For a poetic parody to succeed, its source poem must have aspects so distinctive—its style, its vocabulary, its characters, its scenes, or its dialog—and so unforgettable that the parody's audience will instantly recognize its source. Many poets struggle for years to create a work in some way so unique and so striking that readers remember it. Parodies of "A Wine of Wizardry" prove Sterling had accomplished those goals.

Five days after the Cosmopolitan containing "A Wine of Wizardry" reached subscribers and newsstands, the first parody appeared in newspapers. Several more followed, They were often reprinted. Most were poems, but some were prose, one was a short play, and one was part of a scene in a full-length play: Richard Walton Tully's comedy Cupid the Cow-Punch, based on a novel by Tully's wife Eleanor Gates, features one scene with a poet reading his poem, a parody of "A Wine of Wizardry."

All parodies listed are poems unless noted otherwise.

- John Beets (pseudonym of Wex Jones), "The Other Side," New York American (August 23, 1907), p. 14. Reprinted in Salt Lake Herald (September 8, 1907), p. 15, and Oregon News (September 28, 1907), both as by John Beets; also Los Angeles Examiner (September 21, 1907), p. 20, as by John Beels.
- Ella Wheeler Wilcox, untitled poem (first line: "A wowed Inventress, leering at the crammed"), New York Evening Journal (August 30, 1907), p. 12. Reprinted in Buffalo Enquirer (August 30, 1907), p. 10, San Francisco Examiner (September 7, 1907), p. 18; Los Angeles Examiner (September 12, 1907), p. 22, Portland Oregon Daily Journal (September 20, 1907), p. 8.
- Wex Jones, "The Drink of Demonry," New York American (September 3, 1907), p. 16. Reprinted in San Francisco Examiner (September 10, 1907), p. 20; Salt Lake City Inter-Mountain Republican (September 15, 1907), p. 9.
- William F. Kirk, "Ode to Belmont's Subway," New York Evening Journal (September 3, 1907), p. 9.
- Ella Wheeler Wilcox, untitled quatrain (first line: "With labial echoes, tomb thrown from the dope"), New York Evening Journal (September 5, 1907). Reprinted in San Francisco Examiner (September 12, 1907), p. 16.
- Pegasus Piffle (pseudonym of William F. Kirk), "A Dream of Dope," San Francisco Examiner (September 8, 1907), p. 37.
- C. A. M., untitled couplet (first line: "'The Wine of Wizardry'? Come, Sterling, tell—"; under headline "Poem Shows Genius for Picturing of the Ghastly"), San Francisco Examiner (September 10, 1907).
- Daniel Sendriggan, "A Wine of Cookery: A Drama in the Kitchen of the Hall of Fame" (short play), Wasp v. 58 n. 11 (September 14, 1907), p. 7.
- unsigned, "The Wasp's Circus: For One Week Only. Greatest Show-up on Earth" (prose satire), Wasp v. 58 n. 12 (September 21, 1907), p. 4.
- unsigned, "Lipton's Turndown," Nashville Tennessean (October 1, 1907).
- Richard Walton Tully, Cupid the Cow-Punch (play), Liberty Playhouse, Oakland, California (October 1909).
- unsigned, "Sun Spot Appears on Sterling" (story with a poem), Wasp v. 71 n. 12 (March 21, 1914). Reprinted in Oakland Tribune (March 22, 1914), p. 11.
- unsigned, "The Whine of Poetry" (under headline "Carmel Is Aghast"), Oakland Tribune (June 28, 1914), p. 1.
- Donald Sidney-Fryer, "The Nonsense Eater by Quark Ashcan Smiff" (a parody of Clark Ashton Smith's "The Hashish-Eater," which was inspired by "A Wine of Wizardry"), Aesthetics Ho!: Essays on Art, Literature, and Theatre (New York: Hippocampus Press, 2017), pp. 167–168.
