= Geoffrey Dunn =

Geoffrey Dunn may refer to:

- Geoffrey Dunn (writer), American writer
- Geoffrey Thomas Dunn (1902–1981), English tenor, actor, opera librettist, and director
- Geoff Dunn (born 1961), English drummer
- Geoffrey Dunn, a far-right activist known for his use of the white dragon symbol
