= Betelguese, a Trip Through Hell =

Book by Jean Louis De Esque

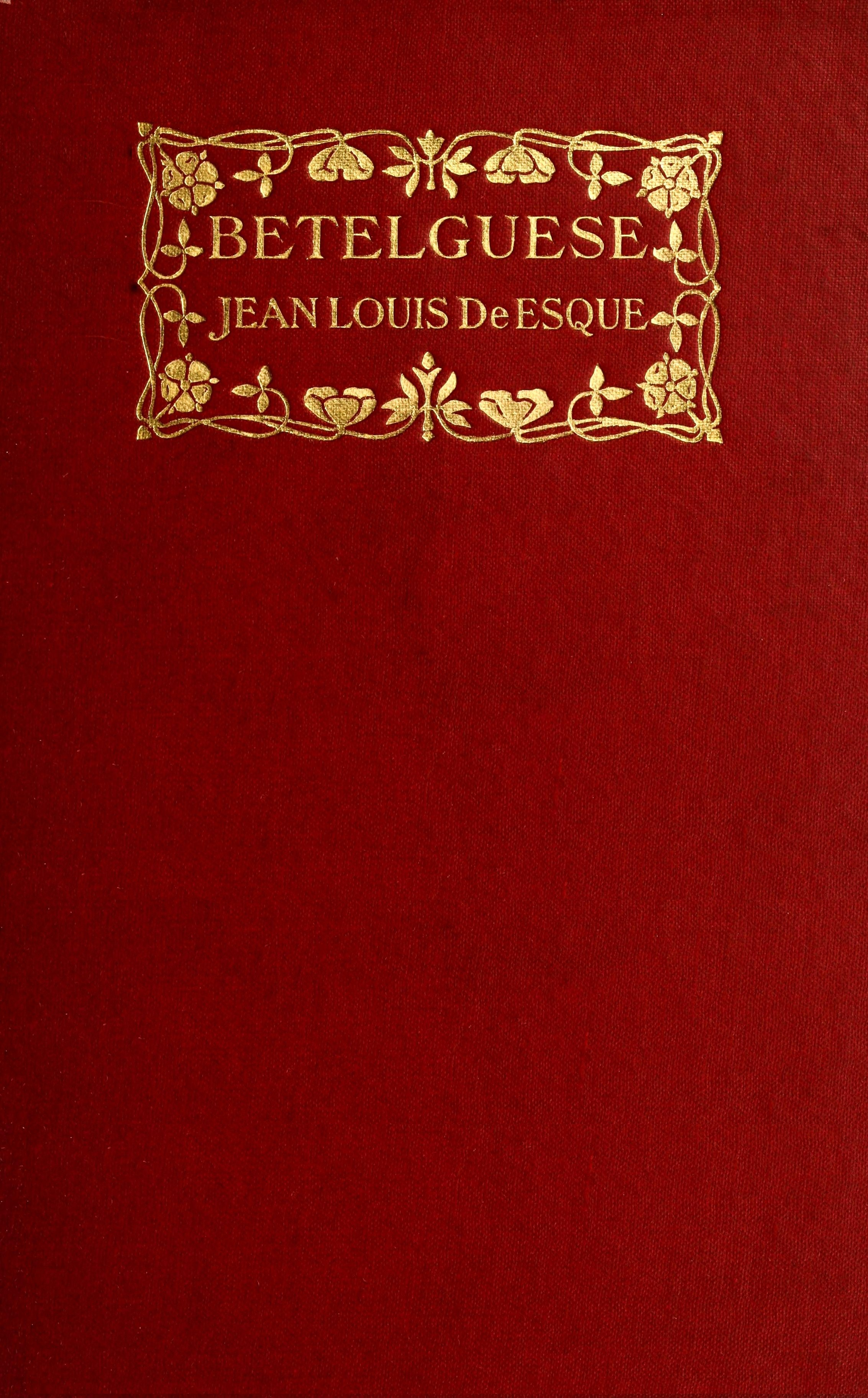
- Cover of the 1908 publication
- Author: Jean Louis De Esque
- Illustrator: Nicholas Briganti
- Language: English
- Genre: Poetry
- Published: July 1, 1908 (Connoisseur's Press)
- Publication place: United States
- Media type: Print (hardcover)
- Pages: 104 pp (first edition)
- OCLC: 16642101
- Text: Betelguese, a Trip Through Hell at Wikisource

Betelguese, a Trip Through Hell is a 1908 lyrical poem book written by Jean Louis De Esque. The publication includes a preface by the author with two poetic works, "When I am Gone" and "Betelguese." The latter poem has been called a "classic" work that utilized off-beat language, considered to be a delight to the philologist. It has been compared to the poetic works of George Sterling and Kenneth Patchen.

The book was published during the height of the nature fakers controversy, and it has been suggested that De Esque elected to release Betelguese, a Trip Through Hell while Theodore Roosevelt was on a trip to Africa in an effort to avoid potential conflict that might have resulted from Roosevelt's awareness of its content.

== Publication ==
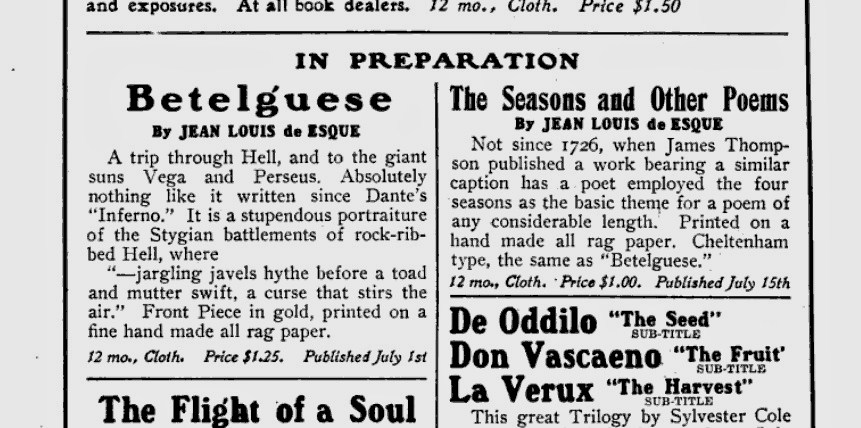
Excerpt from 1908 advertisement of The Bookseller, listing the book "in preparation"

Betelguese, a Trip Through Hell was published by Connoisseur's Press in Jersey City, New Jersey on July 1, 1908. An application for copyright was submitted on September 28, 1907. Two copies were received by the Library of Congress on August 28, 1909. For the publishing company, Betelguese was considered its first work of distinction after several years of modest publications.

The book features a frontispiece by painter Nicholas Briganti, an illustration of Typhon the Greek "Father of all monsters." Betelguese, a Trip Through Hell opens with a prefatory note by De Esque written on September 22, 1907, in which he reveals that the writing of the poem began when he was "up at [his] desk mauling and drubbing the English language with a vengeance for thirty-six consecutive hours, and that [he] awoke at 12.30 A.M," and began writing the poem "Betelguese," continuing to work on it until the early morning. The writer later explained that he repeated this process over the next fifteen nights, completing the work at a total of 8116 words. (Note: Although the preface gives a count of 8116 words, the word count of the 1908 publication is roughly 9400 words.) The preface is succeeded with a photograph of Jean Louis De Esque and a short poem entitled "When I Am Gone." Finally, the publication concludes with the eponymous poetic work "Betelguese," making the length of Betelguese, a Trip Through Hell in total 104 pages.

=== Promotion ===
To promote Betelguese, a Trip Through Hell, Connoisseur's Press took out advertisements months before its release in various literary publications. This included Publishers Weekly, The Bookseller, and The Bookman, which showcased Betelguese, a Trip Through Hell alongside three other works by De Esque which were published in the same year: The Flight of a Soul, The Seasons and other poems, and Silence, the latter which was published under the pseudonym "Stewart." In these advertisements, Betelguese, a Trip Through Hell was listed as being printed on fine, handmade rag paper. The hardcover book featured a gold-stamped title on maroon cloth, with a height of 19.5 centimetres (7.7 in). The book also included a color frontispiece and was printed in Cheltenham typeface. It sold for US$1.25.

The advertisement also called Betelguese, a Trip Through Hell a unique work with "absolutely nothing like it written since Dante's Inferno."

== "Betelguese" ==
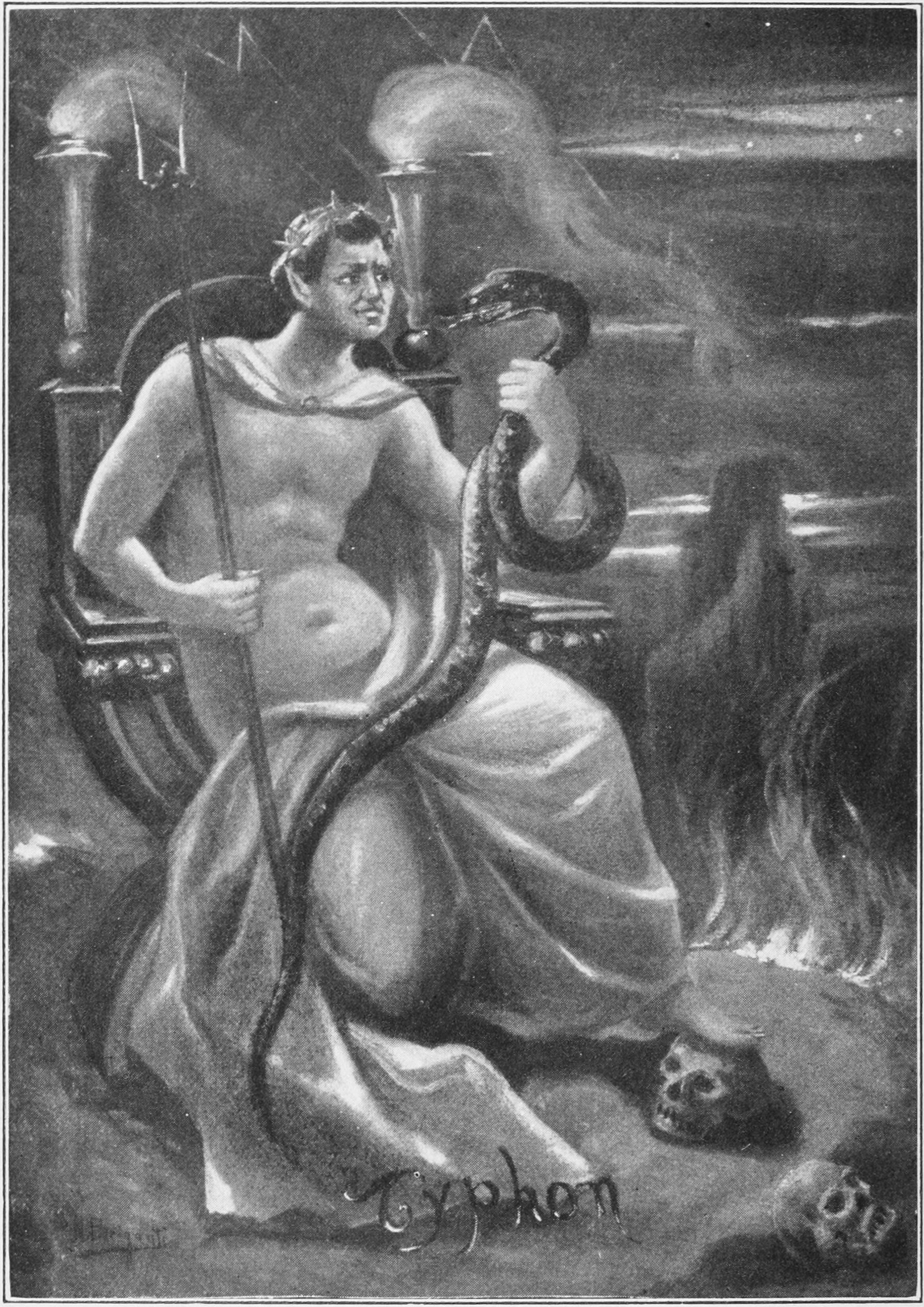
Frontispiece

Betelguese is one of a number of historical variant spellings of Betelgeuse, a red supergiant in the constellation of Orion.

By his own admission, De Esque chose to place hell on this star, over placing hell on Earth, the Moon or the Sun because it was "a celestial pariah, an outcast, the largest of all known comets or outlawed suns in the universe." The latter three were rejected by De Esque: the Sun because it was uninhabitable for animal or vegetable life, and the Moon because it was once part of the Earth. De Esque also describes Betelguese on p. 77 with:

And Betelguese, an evil lair
With infernal, warring legions,
Careens as stars shed tears of woe.

In full, the poem is rife with descriptions of the terrifying aspects of hell, those that dwell there, and the actions thereof. Among those in De Esque's hell are Thomas Fortune Ryan, John Pierpont Morgan, August Belmont, Jr. and John D. Rockefeller. Also appearing regularly throughout "Betelguese" are many Greek mythological figures, including the subject of the frontispiece, Typhon.

Similar to what would be a recurring double-quatrain, the rhyme scheme of most of "Betelguese" has four lines to a stanza, wherein the two successive stanzas, line one rhymes with line five, line two with line six and so on; or, "ABCD-ABCD." The following sets of two stanzas have their own rhyming words. Additionally, "Betelguese" was written in an octametric (8-syllable) meter, where De Esque contracts typically multi-syllable words, such as "cavern'd" to be read as two syllables, as opposed to "poisoned" to be read as three syllables. (Note: There are a few exceptions in the work, but most lines are octametric.)

=== Reception ===
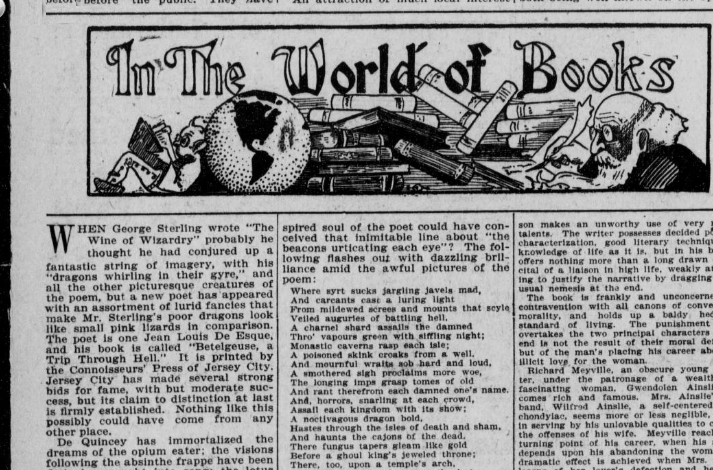
Excerpt from April 18, 1909 edition of the Los Angeles Herald, highlighting Betelguese, a Trip Through Hell.

The main work, "Betelguese", has been called a "study in unconscious parody" by the Manchester Literary Club, a "classic" by Bookseller and Stationer, and a "frabjous poem" by the Saturday Review. It has also been called an "yrie poem" (Note: The word "yrie" is an alternate spelling of eerie.) by Publishers Weekly.

Featured in the section "In the World of Books" of April 18, 1909 edition of the Los Angeles Herald, Betelguese, a Trip Through Hell was likened to George Sterling's poem "The Wine of Wizardry". In comparing the two poetic works, the columnist felt that "Betelguese" had made "Mr. Sterling's poor dragons look like small pink lizards," stating that De Esque's work had "immortalized the dreams of the opium eater." In later years, it had also been compared to the poetic work of Kenneth Patchen.

On its verbose language, one editor at Manchester Literary Club felt that the "enthusiastic philologist" would "make heaven" of Betelguese, a Trip Through Hell. However, a review in the March 28, 1909 edition of the Salt Lake Tribune was mixed on De Esque's off-beat use of the English language, stating, "it is plentifully sprinkled with weird words without any particular meaning." The Salt Lake Tribune columnist went on to say that "Betelguese was a "wild sort of rhapsody, which is less fierce than one might suppose from the subtitle."

Betelguese, a Trip Through Hell was published during the nature fakers conflict; the Los Angeles Herald columnist further suggests that the book was intentionally released during one of US President Theodore Roosevelt's trips to Africa. According to them, lines such as "mildewed screes" and "poisoned skinks" would have shocked Roosevelt; he goes on to say that he "hopes the poet will have ready an explanation before Colonel Roosevelt returns from Africa."

== See also ==
- Betelgeuse
- Hell in popular culture

== Bibliography ==
- The Annual American catalog. Office of the Publishers' weekly. 1909.
- The Bookman. Vol. 27. Dodd, Mead and Co. 1908.
- The Bookseller. Vol. 28. Excelsior Pub. House. 1908.
- Bookseller and Stationer. Vol. 24. Maclean Pub. Co. OCLC 10223582.
- Catalogue of copyright entries: Books. Vol. 6. Library of Congress. 1910. p. 665.
- De Esque, Jean Louis (1908). Betelguese, a Trip Through Hell . Connoisseur's Press. p. 104 – via Wikisource.
- "In the World of Books". Los Angeles Herald. April 18, 1909.
- Papers... Vol. 46. Manchester Literary Club. 1920. OCLC 41006772.
- Publishers Weekly. Vol. 73. F. Leypoldt. 1908. p. 2024.
- Publishers Weekly. Vol. 87. F. Leypoldt. 1915.
- "Some "Strange English"". The Salt Lake Tribune. March 28, 1909.
- "Saturday review". Saturday Review of Literature. (Aug.2,1924-Dec.29,1951). 25 (1). Saturday Review Associates. 1942. ISSN 0147-5932. OCLC 1777743.
- The United States catalog: books in print. H.W. Wilson Company. 1909. p. 678.
