= Samuel Selwyn Chamberlain =

American journalist and newspaper editor

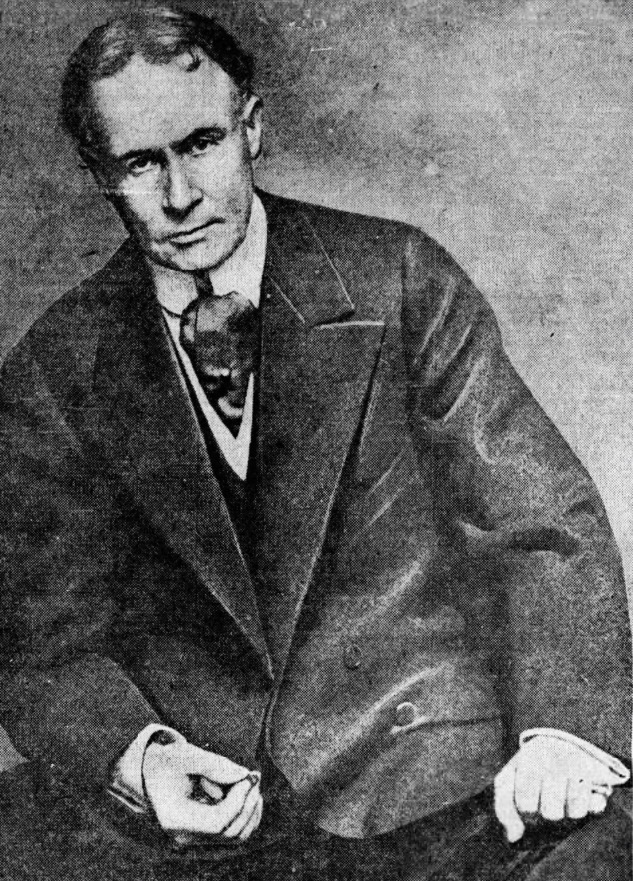
- Born: September 25, 1851; Walworth, New York, US
- Died: January 25, 1916 (aged 64); San Francisco, California, US
- Occupations: Journalist, newspaper editor

Samuel Selwyn Chamberlain (25 September 1851 – 25 January 1916) was an American journalist and newspaper editor.

== Biography ==
Chamberlain was born on September 25, 1851, in Walworth, New York. He graduated from New York University in 1875. He started his journalistic career at the Newark Advertiser (1873–1874). Within a short time he joined the staff of the New York World. He then moved to the New York Herald (1875–1879) as an assistant editor. He went abroad with James Gordon Bennett Jr. of the Herald, and was for a time editor of the Paris edition of that journal.

In 1879, Chamberlain became editor of the New York World, but left to take charge of the New York Evening Telegram in 1881. He founded Le Matin of Paris in 1884 and was its editor for two years before returning to the United States.

In 1889, William Randolph Hearst engaged Chamberlain as editor of the San Francisco Examiner, and he remained on the Pacific coast until 1895, when he came back to New York City as editor of the New York Morning Journal. In 1900 he became managing editor of the Philadelphia North American, which soon resumed its former place among the successful publications of that city.

A year or two later, Chamberlain returned to the Hearst service, and until his death acted as general staff officer. He went to the Chicago Examiner, was recalled to the New York American (1905–1907) followed by a year as editor of the Cosmopolitan (1907–1908). In 1909 he was appointed editor of the San Francisco Examiner for the second time. For several years, until the spring of 1915, he was the Hearst representative in London. His last work was as editor of the Boston American. He died on January 25, 1916, in San Francisco.

== Character assessment ==
Perhaps William Randolph Hearst's most flamboyant and ostentatious employee

— Stanley Wertheim (1997)

Chamberlain was known in journalism for his news reporting and work with specialized feature stories. Contemporary observers highlighted his news judgment and stylistic approach to feature writing.

== Family ==
On September 15, 1873, Chamberlain married Mary T. Munson. At the time of his death Chamberlain was married and had one son.

== See also ==
- "A Wine of Wizardry" - Poem by George Sterling that Chamberlain made controversial.
