= Jean Louis De Esque =

American author and poet

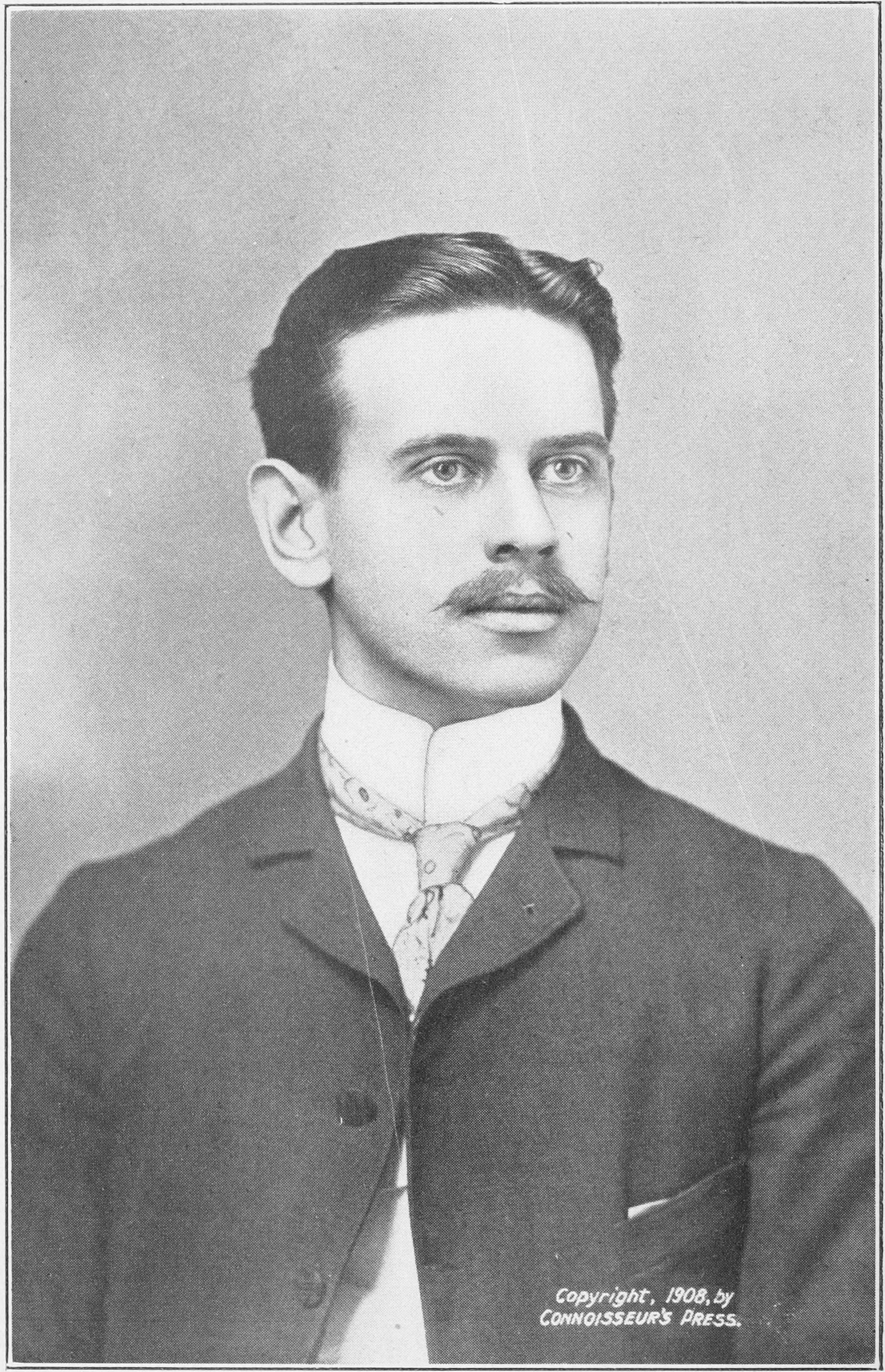
- Born: 1879
- Died: 1956 (aged 76–77)
- Occupations: Poet, author
- Writing career
- Notable work: "Betelguese, a trip through hell"

Jean Louis De Esque (1879–1956) was an author and poet. Several of his works were published under Connoisseur's Press in Jersey City, New Jersey. He also wrote under the pseudonym "Stewart."

== Works ==
- Betelguese, a trip through hell, (1908).
- Silence: a compound problem novel, (1908).
- The Flight of a Soul, (1908).
- The Seasons and Other Poems, (1908).
- A Count in the Fo'c'sle, (1932)
