= The Testimony of the Suns =

1903 astronomical fantasy poem by George Sterling

- by George Sterling
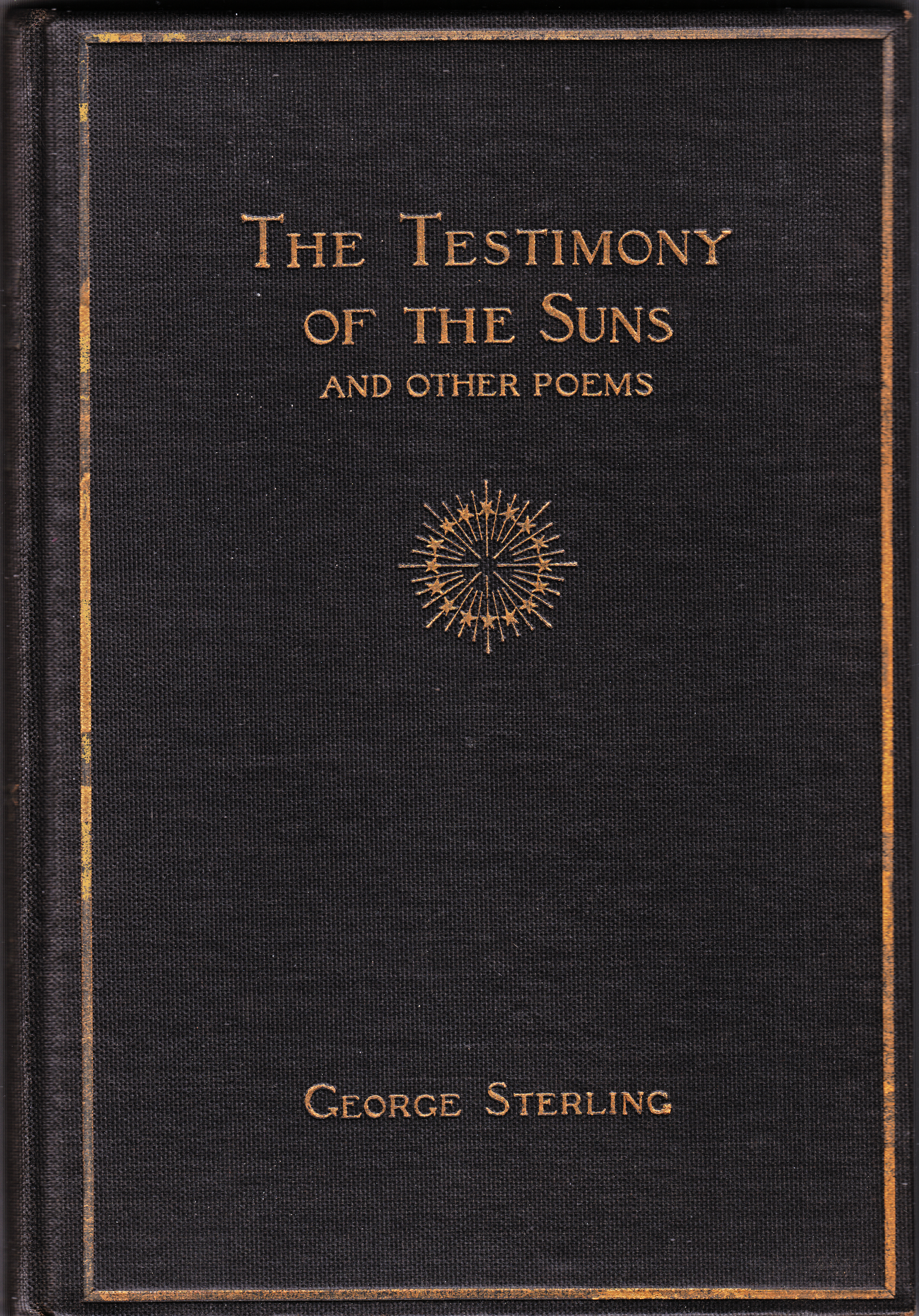
- The Testimony of the Suns and Other Poems by George Sterling, 1903 first edition
- Written: 1902-1903
- First published in: 1903
- Country: United States
- Language: English
- Subject(s): astronomy, eternity, interstellar travel
- Genre(s): fantasy, astronomy, science fiction

"The Testimony of the Suns" is a lengthy astronomical poem by American poet and playwright George Sterling that combines elements of science, fantasy, science fiction, and philosophy. Literary historian S. T. Joshi called it Sterling's "longest poem and one of his greatest." Upon the poem's first publication, critic Ambrose Bierce wrote in the New York American: "...its publication is an event of capital importance. Written in French and published in Paris, it would stir the very stones in the streets. ...It is nothing but literature—nothing but the most notable utterance that has been heard in our Western World since the great heart of Poe was broken against the adamant of his country's inattention."

The unusual poem was too long for magazines and was rejected by book publishers, so in 1903 Sterling self-published it in his first book, The Testimony of the Suns and Other Poems. When his book was released, Sterling's poems had been published in newspapers and magazines for seven years. The Washington Post had published his first important poem, and the prestigious national magazine Harper's Monthly had published another Sterling poem, but "The Testimony of the Suns" marked the first time Sterling's poetry attracted nationwide attention from critics. The national critical success of "The Testimony of the Suns" established Sterling's career as a poet.

== Creation of the poem ==
=== Influences on "The Testimony of the Suns" ===
Sterling learned to love astronomy because "my dear dead father was greatly interested in it, and I've spent many hours on the house-top with him and his telescope." He marveled at planets, stars, and galaxies—apparently resting in peace but actually slowly and endlessly colliding with and destroying each other.

Another inspiration to Sterling was British author H. G. Wells, to whom he wrote: "I feel so far I've done only one thing worth of any one's attention—an astronomical poem I call ‘The Testimony of the Suns', written under the inspiration of your many references to the stars, notably that tremendous thing entitled ‘Under the Knife.' They (your references) thrill me like great poetry. No one loves them as I do. The sleeper gazing on the unchanged constellations—the Time Traveller aware of the star-drift [in Wells' novel The Time Machine]—how they make me ache!" Wells' short story "Under the Knife" tells of a man under anesthesia for surgery who dies on the operating table. His consciousness floats out of his body, away from Earth, beyond our galaxy. Before the man is brought back to life, he sees our entire universe as a speck in an immense hand.

Sterling was an avid reader of Edgar Allan Poe's writings, so Poe's last book Eureka: A Prose Poem may have influenced "The Testimony of the Suns." Historians of science have claimed that in Eureka Poe was the first person to conceive a Newtonian evolving universe in which stars and galaxies are collapsing together.

Thomas Benediktsson in his book George Sterling said the poem was also influenced by German scientist-philosopher Ernst Haeckel's 1899 book Die Welträthsel (published in America as The Riddle of the Universe).

=== Writing process and reactions from friends ===
Sometime after December 16, 1901, Sterling began to write a long poem depicting the galaxies and stars of "the stellar universe at strife, when to the eye it is a symbol of such peace and changelessness ...It surely is a war if the cosmic processes are viewed as a whole."

Sterling wrote his poem during morning commutes to work from his house in Piedmont, writing in his head while riding one of his uncle Frank C. Havens' ferryboats across the bay to San Francisco, then polishing his verses during his twelve-minute walk from the Ferry Building up Market Street to Uncle Frank's corporate headquarters at 14 Sansome Street. Not until Sterling reached his large office and sat at his mammoth rolltop desk did he commit that morning's words to paper. His long poem's draft in his penciled neat handwriting eventually filled six small notebooks.

In early 1902 Sterling sent his untitled, not-yet-completed "star poem" to his mentor, the author and critic Ambrose Bierce. Bierce responded: "Where are you going to stop?—I mean at what stage of development? ...you are advancing at a stupendous rate. This last beats any and all that went before—or I am bewitched and befuddled. I dare not trust myself to say what I think of it. In manner it is great, but the greatness of the theme!—that is beyond anything. It is a new field—the broadest yet discovered. ...You must make it your domain. You shall be the poet of the skies, the prophet of the suns."

Sterling worked on his star poem for more than a year, expanding it, sending drafts to Bierce for comments, and polishing every stanza. He showed a draft to astronomer Garrett P. Serviss to make sure his scientific terms and concepts were accurate. In February 1903, Sterling finally finished "The Testimony of the Suns." It was 644 lines long, far too lengthy for any magazine. That month Sterling shared his poem with his closest friend, Jack London. Five years later London remembered how he felt when he first read the star poem. He wrote how Martin (a character London based on himself) echoed his own response after reading a similar star poem (written by a character London based on Sterling). London sneaks in Sterling's title "The Testimony of the Suns" in his fifth sentence below:

It was perfect art. Form triumphed over substance, if triumph it could be called where the last conceivable atom of substance had found expression in so perfect construction as to make Martin's head swim with delight, to put passionate tears into his eyes, and to send chills creeping up and down his back. It was a long poem of six or seven hundred lines, and it was a fantastic, amazing, unearthly thing. It was terrific, impossible; and yet there it was, scrawled in black ink across the sheets of paper. It dealt with man and his soul-gropings in their ultimate terms, plumbing the abysses of space for the testimony of remotest suns and rainbow spectrums. It was a mad orgy of imagination ...The poem swung in majestic rhythm to the cool tumult of interstellar conflict, to the onset of starry hosts, to the impact of cold suns and the flaming up of nebulae in the darkened void; and through it all, unceasing and faint, like a silver shuttle, ran the frail, piping voice of man, a querulous chip amid the screaming of planets and the crash of systems.

"There is nothing like it in literature," Martin said, when at last he was able to speak. "It's wonderful!—wonderful! It has gone to my head. I am drunken with it. ...I know I'm making a fool of myself, but the thing has obsessed me."

In 1904, when Alexander M. Robertson published a second edition of Sterling's book The Testimony of the Suns and Other Poems, the poet made changes to the texts of "The Testimony of the Suns," creating a slightly different second version. In the book's 1907 third edition he made a few more changes. When Sterling prepared his star poem for inclusion in his 1923 Selected Poems collection, he changed his first line from "The winter sunset fronts the North...." to "The heavens darken in the North...." He changed appearances of the word "deems" to "thinks" or "dreams." He made more than twenty other changes, resulting in his fourth and final version of "The Testimony of the Suns."

== Subjects and structure of the poem ==
During the time Sterling was writing "The Testimony of the Suns," his poem's subject seemed to change. Two-and-a-half months into writing it, he said: "the whole poem will be on life, or rather the human portion of life." Two-and-a-half weeks later he explained: "As for God, I fear I'll have to leave him in. The poem being a polemic against those believing in Him, His presence was necessary." Three months after that: "First, I hope it will be clear enough to the intellectual reader that my invocation to the stars is only an allegory of man's search of the universe for the secret of life ..."

Sterling wrote "The Testimony of the Suns" using accentual-syllabic verse in iambic tetrameter rhythm, structured as four-line stanzas using the ABBA rhyme format. The same structure was used by Alfred, Lord Tennyson for his famous poem "In Memoriam A.H.H.," which led some critics to compare Sterling to Tennyson.

Sterling divided his long poem into three sections: an opening epigraph quoted from an Ambrose Bierce poem, and two parts labeled "I" and "II." The three sections together total 162 quatrains, or 651 lines including two dates and the epigraph's attribution to Bierce.

=== Opening quotation ===
The opening epigraph quotes four lines from Ambrose Bierce's 1888 poem "Invocation," which Sterling later called Bierce's "one great poem, as noble an invocation as we have heard this side of the Atlantic."

=== Part I ===
"Part I describes the ‘war' of the stars in the cosmos," says Thomas E. Benediktsson in George Sterling. "The poem opens with a contrast between the perspective of ‘Time,' or the temporal vision of man, and ‘Eternity,' or the absolute vision of universal law. ‘In the eyes of time,' then, the evening skies seem peaceful, intransigent, and beyond all human conflict. But to the eyes of Eternity, the skies are a vast battleground: the stars are at war; their movements are such that one will invariably collide with another, causing it to disintegrate into a nebula or dead star. In the eternal flux of the cosmos, however, nebulae eventually evolve into new stars. Thus, there is an external process of creation and destruction in the heavens, quite remote from human concerns, and so alien to human time that it takes a supreme intellectual effort even to conceptualize it."

As Benediktsson points out, when Sterling uses the word "time," his meaning can often be clarified by substituting the word "man." For example, here are the opening lines of Part I:

The heavens darken in the North....
The light deserts the quiet sky....
From their far gates how silently
The stars of evening tremble forth!

Time, to thy sight what peace they share
On Night's inviolable breast!
Remote in solitudes of rest,
Afar from human change or care.

By mentally changing the fifth line to "Man, to thy sight what peace they share," the stanza's meaning becomes more clear.

Many of the Part I stanzas are speeches addressed to different personified stars. They can seem repetitive, almost ritualized. Benediktsson explains that "each of these is a slight variation on the same expression of wonder at the immense scope and mystery of the conflict."

Part I consists of 80 quatrains. It ends with the date "December, 1901." This is the month when Sterling began to write his as-yet-untitled star poem.

=== Part II ===
If Part I portrays an immense universe of galaxies and stars colliding in never-ending conflict, "...Part II attempts to relate human life to that universal war. ...Sterling intends to develop further the pathos of human attempts to anthropomorphize the universe. ...Sterling goes on at length to discuss the folly and vanity of those men who try to question the laws of the universe as science has revealed them. The delusions that men fall prey to can be grouped into two categories: the speculations that mankind is eternal, and the 'dream of Faith' that there is life beyond death. These are never to be fulfilled, because law is unalterable and is subject to the same law of destruction that controls the destinies of stars. Even if there is an apocalypse for man, it will certainly not bring the universe to an end."

Part II consists of 81 quatrains. It ends with the date "February, 1902." Sterling's reason for including this date is unknown. It is neither the date Sterling started Part II nor when he finished it.

== Book appearances ==
In spite of critical acclaim for "The Testimony of the Suns," because of the poem's length it has rarely appeared in books.

=== 1903 self-published first edition ===
When Sterling finished "The Testimony of the Suns" he grouped it with 43 shorter poems and submitted his collection to book publishers. All rejected it. Sterling decided to publish his book himself while also paying to publish Shapes of Clay, a collection of poems by Bierce. Sterling selected Charles Murdock, a friend of his uncle Frank C. Havens, as his book printer. To handle book marketing and sales, he hired William E. Wood, a publicist with Hale Brothers department stores in San Jose. Wood knew a little about the book business because he had once worked for a San Francisco bookstore.

Sterling published his book The Testimony of the Suns and Other Poems under Wood's name in November 1903. On Christmas Eve, Sterling inscribed a copy "To our genius, Jack London: Here's my book, my heart you have already."

Evidence of quantity published for the first edition of The Testimony of the Suns varies from 500 to 650 copies. Whatever the quantity, the first edition sold out quickly.

=== 1904 second edition ===
Scotsman Alexander M. Robertson owned one of San Francisco's leading bookstores and had started a small publishing company. He and Sterling signed an agreement to publish a second edition of The Testimony of the Suns and Other Poems, which Robertson published in November, 1904. He printed 1,000 copies of the book but sales were slow. In April 1906, the 1906 San Francisco earthquake and fire burned Robertson's bookstore building to the ground. He had sold about 200 copies of the second edition; all others were destroyed, making it the rarest of the three The Testimony of the Suns editions.

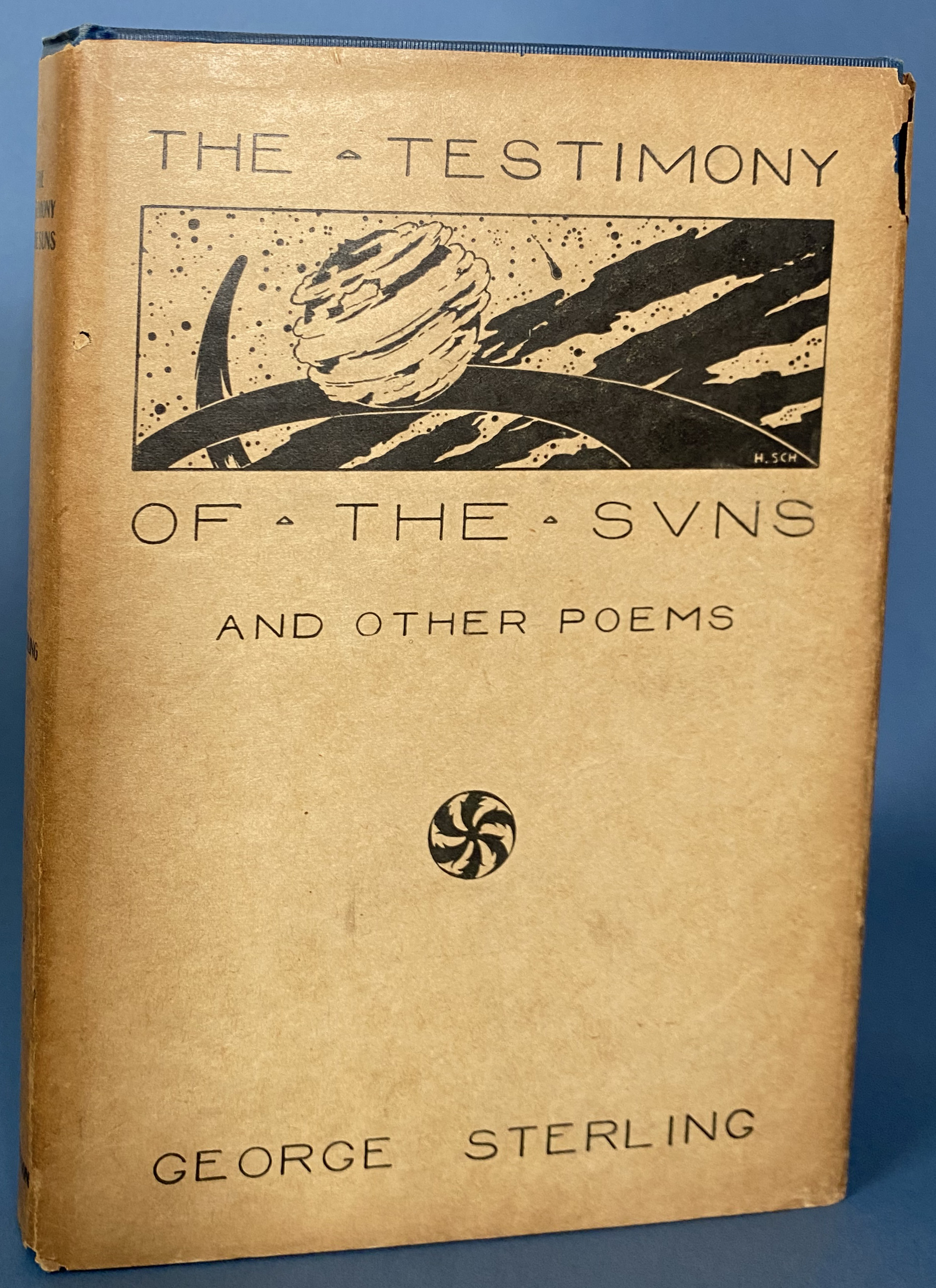
1907 Testimony of the Suns and Other Poems 3rd edition in dust jacket

=== 1907 third edition ===
After Robertson recovered from the earthquake and fire, he published a third edition of The Testimony of the Suns and Other Poems. Sterling's friend Herman George Scheffauer drew new astronomical art for the third edition's front cover and dust jacket. (The first two editions had no dust jacket). Robertson bound 920 copies of the third edition and published it in October 1907.

=== 1923, 1970, and 1974 Selected Poems ===
New York publisher Henry Holt and Company signed Sterling to select a bookful of poems from his twenty-five years as a poet. Sterling included "The Testimony of the Suns," but he revised it. He wrote a new first line. He also remembered critic Harriet Monroe lambasting "the worst excesses" in his poem's language: "he never thinks—he deems," she said. So he replaced all "deems" in his poem with "thinks" or "dreams." He modernized "hath" to "has" but did not update "ye" to "you" nor "thy" to "your." He made other changes as well. This fourth and final version of his star poem Sterling placed in Selected Poems as the last poem.

Selected Poems was eventually printed by four different publishers based in four different cities: New York: Henry Holt, 1923; San Francisco: A. M. Robertson, 1923; St. Clair Shores, Michigan: Scholarly Press, 1970; and [Irvine, California]: Reprint Services Corp., 1974.

=== 1927 annotated facsimile edition ===
Thirteen months after Sterling's November 1926 death, the prestigious Book Club of California published an oversize (14 5/8 by 9 1/2 in or 37 by 24 cm) volume as a beautifully-designed tribute. The Testimony of the Suns: Including Comments, Suggestions, and Annotations by Ambrose Bierce: A Facsimile of the Original Typewritten Manuscript with the Marginal Notes by George Sterling in Black Ink and the Comments by Ambrose Bierce in Red Ink (San Francisco: Book Club of California, 1927) also included an introduction by author, historian, and Book Club secretary Oscar Lewis and "A Memoir of Ambrose Bierce" by Albert Bender. Historian David Magee said: "The poet was a protege of Ambrose Bierce whose annotations and suggestions, reproduced here in facsimile, show how closely student and mentor worked together. Comparison of the manuscript and printed text proves that Sterling abided by most of Bierce's advice." The limited edition of 300 copies quickly sold out.

=== 2003 and 2013 anthologies ===
The third version of "The Testimony of the Suns" was included in the George Sterling anthology, The Thirst of Satan: Poems of Fantasy and Terror, S. T. Joshi, ed. (New York: Hippocampus Press, 2003), pp. 23–47.

The final version of "The Testimony of the Suns" (the one from Selected Poems) appeared in George Sterling, Complete Poetry, S. T. Joshi and David E. Schultz, eds. (New York: Hippocampus Press, 2013), volume 1, pp. 17–34. In the poem's third line, the word "from" is mistakenly printed as "foam." Extensive notes on the poem appear in volume 2, pp. 752–754. The notes claim that one of the three The Testimony of the Suns and Other Poems versions was used as the source for the text, but that is not accurate. The text presented in Complete Poetry comes from Sterling's Selected Poems.

=== 2022 bilingual critical edition ===
The poem is printed in both English and Spanish on facing pages and is annotated in George Sterling, El Testimonio de los Soles y Otros Poemas: Edicióne Crítica y Bilingüe, Ariadna García Carreño, ed. and translator (Madrid: Editorial Verbum, 2022), pp. 100–149. The English text comes from the third edition of The Testimony of the Suns and Other Poems.

== Initial critical responses ==
William E. Wood, Sterling's employee for the first edition of The Testimony of the Suns and Other Poems, was a publicist. He knew how to get a good mailing list to send review copies to book reviewers. Beginning in December 1903, reviews appeared in dozens of newspapers and magazines across the country. Some reviews were enthusiastic and some were mixed.

The first review appeared in William Randolph Hearst's newspaper, the New York American. Sterling's mentor Ambrose Bierce wrote of Sterling's "majestic poem'": "Doubtless it will make no impression on a country that devours Mr. Riley. Yet its publication is an event of capital importance. Written in French and published in Paris, it would stir the very stones in the streets. ...It is nothing but literature—nothing but the most notable utterance that has been heard in our Western World since the great heart of Poe was broken against the adamant of his country's inattention." Bierce's passionate review was reprinted in the New York Evening Journal, the San Francisco Examiner, and in Sterling's birthplace newspaper, the Sag Harbor Corrector.

The New York Times' admiration was more muted: "In The Testimony of the Suns and Other Poems, by George Sterling, ...there is a nice sense of personal vision and thoughtful contemplation, and also there is a touch of intellectual passion that gives to the author's mental attitude toward common things the delicate dignity and reserve in utterance most grateful to the mind weary of an overflow of sentiment. Here again the longer poems [such as "The Testimony of the Suns"] are the best and the most characteristic ..." The Times review ended: "...the presence of the moral quality at the source of Mr. Sterling's poetry is what gives it the note of character that promises permanence. And he has been able to deliver his message without contortions of style. In his management of his simple metres and in his discriminating use of words fitted to his thought he gives the pleasure that can be gained only from such respectful use of the intellectual instrument."

The poem also impressed Book News Monthly, a national magazine for the book business: "...the volume The Testimony of the Suns and Other Poems, written by George Sterling, ...in every part rings true to the nature of the man. The poems are often of great lyrical beauty and always have some music in them. The "Testimony of the Sun[s]," which gives the book its name, while it has many good qualities is surpassed by the ode to "Music" ...The volume has in it an unspeakable note of sadness, which adds greatly to its appealing powers, and we feel that here is a man who has suffered and conquered nobly." A second review added: "Mr. Sterling's verse is suffused with sense of the worth and dignity of the poet's work. His has the thought-enkindled line. There is metrical instinct. A little excess of imagery."

The Atlanta Constitution wrote: "There is no doubt at all about the genius of George Sterling, author of "The Testimony of the Suns" ...In Mr. Sterling's work there is much that recalls Tennyson—his measure, and, at times, his imagery, but he's original enough, for all that."

The New York Evening Post commented on the second edition of Sterling's book: "It boots not that "The Testimony of the Suns" is the most distinguished poetic work produced in the West in years. It is a miracle that any work of poetry whatsoever should require reprinting within six months. The wonder grows when one considers that "The Testimony of the Suns," if it is anything, it is reserved, lofty, dignified, severe—and, to the general [public], cryptic. As readers who recall the review of the Evening Post remember, the poem concerns the testimony of astronomical science as to the personal immortality of man. The conclusion is reached that man may only dream of personal immortality—may dream in futility eternal. ...Is there not ‘hope for poetry' when second editions are required for such as this?"

The Lincoln Nebraska State Journal reported: "It has been said by the critics that this age is without real poets; that the living writers of verse cannot approach the majestic, soul-uplifting, hair-curling heights attained by the artists of old whose scope of thought may only be apprehended by the tutored mind. ...Look again—such a poet lives, and his home is in California. ...And while "the testimony of the suns" yields no satisfying solution of the great problem of life and death, we are forced to admit that in style and diction it is bully good poetry."

From Kentucky, the Louisville Courier-Journal wrote: "The Testimony of the Suns and Other Poems, by George Sterling, is a volume of poems of more than common merit. While many of them are in the minor key, other chords ring true and pure, their author is possessed of the genuine poetic fire."

The Sag Harbor Corrector's lengthy review not only told how a reviewer felt about the poem but also described its structure: "It was reserved for Sterling to enshrine in poetry the cosmic process of nature and to send his mind forth to the farthest stars and get from them, if possible, some light as to the origin and destiny of the universe. The poem begins with these beautiful lines: [First two stanzas are reprinted.] ...The second part of the poem is alive to the timelessness of eternity. It sings of the burning out of the stars, of their ashen bulks and of the dark that will replace the rays of Orion when its suns have died. The poet looks far for a divine revelation but is rewarded by the old-time question: "Canst thou by searching find out God?" ...The poet craves from the silence of the star [the] solution of its mystery, and the poem ends:

And crave, unanswered, till denied
By cosmic gloom and stellar glare,
The brains are dust that bore the pray'r,
And dust the yearning lips that cried."

The magazine Impressions Quarterly printed a four-page review of Sterling's book that began enthusiastically but ended by disagreeing with Sterling's views of God and of humanity's insignificance in the cosmos and eternity:

A poet of the first magnitude has risen. We cannot judge or criticize him by casual reading, nor get to the full depth of his meaning without a good deal of thought on our part, for this man is one of the great poets. ...We are made to feel at once the immensity and the minuteness of our thinking souls, and made to grasp the finiteness of the expanse of the starlit heavens, and, more than all, the encircling vastness of God.

These splendid excursions of the poet are for the most part found in the title poem of the collection, "The Testimony of the Suns," in which the questions of Life and the Purpose of Life are asked of the great stars, which give no answer. The theme is black and without hope, and we are depressed by despair while traversing the spaces of the stars and learning their reality and magnitude ...

But the resonant stanzas fill us with wonder; the rolling of the words, massive and thunderous, is suggestive of the rotundity of Virgil. ...This poem, "The Testimony of the Suns," is almost very great, and the production of a poet of a high order ....It is to be regretted that many stanzas are marred by the use of uncouth words, whose frequent repetitions throughout the book point to their being his "pet words." Nevertheless, we ought to forgive Mr. Sterling all his whimsical words and hard names in glad thankfulness for his many noble stanzas, so full of Miltonic grandeur, and for his earnest faith in the great God—a faith told with a majesty of expression reminding us of the Book of Job.

His philosophy is, however, appalling rather than convincing, and omits that one all-important step in the evolution of the body of man from the nebula, which step is the breathing into him the breath of Life. ...In "The Testimony of the Suns," the hopeless mystery of Life, from the entirely materialistic point of view, is clearly stated in lines of surpassing beauty and power, even though we take a happier view of it than the closing stanzas."

That Impressions Quarterly review was commented upon by other magazines and newspapers. In "Almost a Very Great Poet Is Discovered," the Minneapolis Journal said: "A new and great—'almost very great'—poet has been discovered by Impressions Quarterly. ...Mr. Sterling, it seems, ...falls short of the insight which characterizes the very great poets, but then Mr. Sterling is only ‘almost very great'." The magazine Godwin's Weekly said the Impressions Quarterly "reviewer hails the California bard as a poet of the first magnitude, which appears to be rather too glowing an appreciation, although there can be no question of the poet's distinctive gifts as a singer of melodious songs."

One unusual form of criticism came from Clarence E. Eddy, a prospector, poet, reporter for the Salt Lake Tribune, and editor and publisher of the Roosevelt, Idaho Thunder Mountain News. Eddy wrote a poem, "To the Singer of the Suns," which praised Sterling and "The Testimony of the Suns":

No clarion note so clear and strong
As is this mighty voice of thine,
And ne'er before has mortal song
Ascended nearer the divine.

But Eddy believed that Sterling's poem failed because:

Beyond unnumbered suns it sings,
But sobs at last by gulfs of night
In weariness it folds its wings ...

Eddy later expanded his poem's points in a lengthy prose review, stating that Sterling "is essentially a poet of humanity, but, as a prelude, sings of the heavens; he diverts us from our littleness and the lusts of earth to contemplate all of God's great handiwork that human reason can grasp. The myriad voices of the little singers and daily rhym[e]sters are lulled and lost in the deep tones of this mighty singer of the new day, who has poured the fruition of the sciences and the centuries of thought into a poem, but much of the greatness of this poem is due to the awful splendor of its theme." But Sterling's "Testimony" did not satisfy Eddy: "Thus contemplating the vast wonders and questioning the mysteries of creation, and knowing man's craving for immortality, the poet does not give us the final word of hope for which we hunger, and it is this, if anything, that the great poem fails. One lays the book down with a sense of bereavement, for though its music has sweep upon the heart-strings and its majesty has borne the mind amid the systems of unnumbered suns, it ceases at last in a sob."

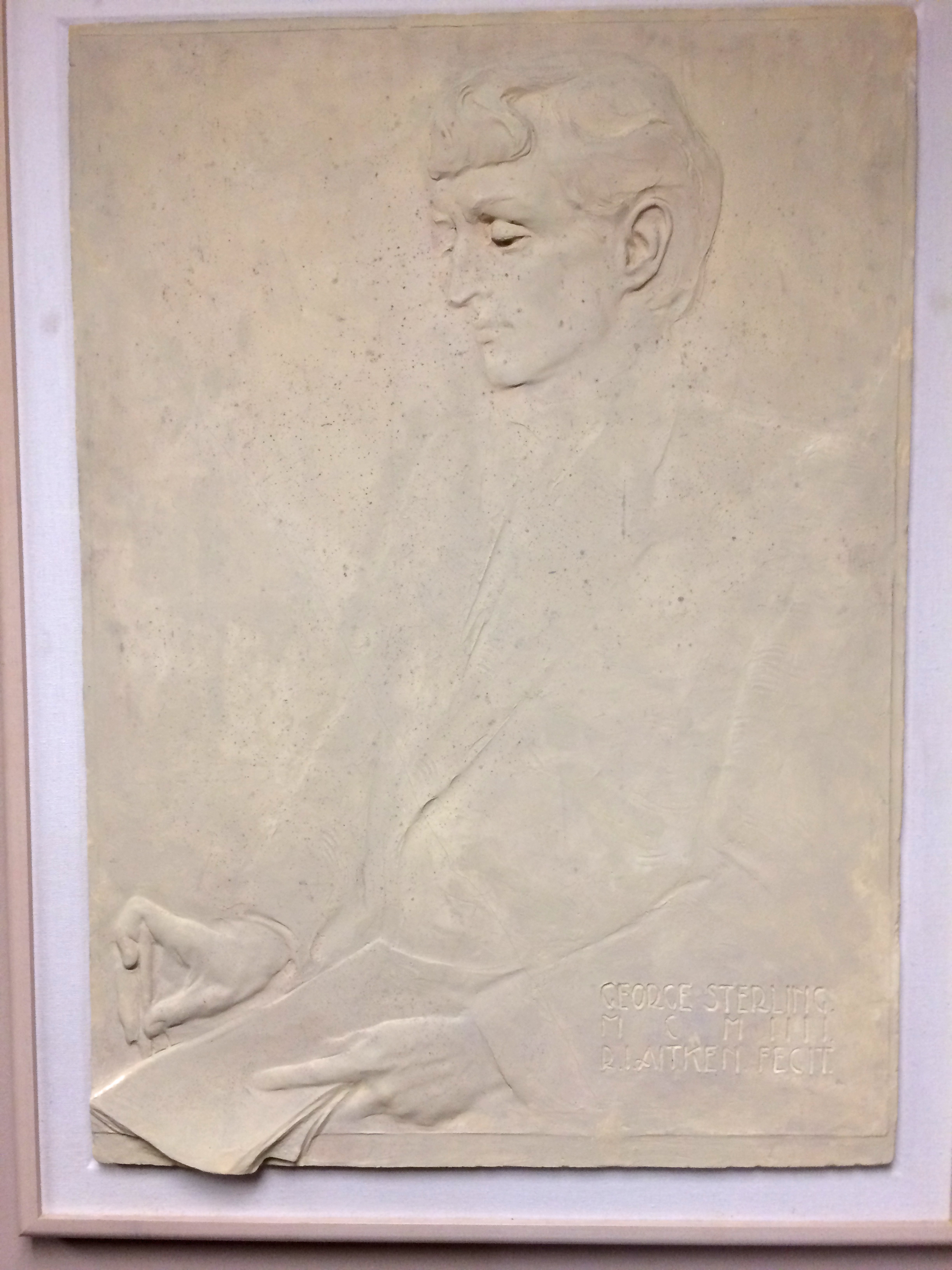
1904 Robert Ingersoll Aitken bas relief sculpture of poet George Sterling.

Sterling was chosen as one of the San Francisco's six top literary lights by the committee creating the San Francisco pavilion for the 1904 St. Louis World's Fair. He sat for a bas relief portrait by sculptor Robert Ingersoll Aitken, best known today for his sculptures on the United States Supreme Court building. Aitken's sculpture of Sterling was displayed at the World's Fair. Today Aitken's sculpture of Sterling is on permanent display in the Local History Department of the Harrison Memorial Library in Carmel-by-the-Sea, California.

Not all reviewers approved of Sterling's poem and book. Some reviews were mixed, but the qualities reviewers disliked varied. For example, the Buffalo [New York] Courier said: "Th[a]t author shows considerable power of imagination and no little feeling, but the thought is not always so plain as one might wish. Then, too, the meter used seems at times halting." In Missouri, the St. Louis Republic was not impressed: "In short, Mr. Sterling is enjoyable after you have past the ‘choral trumpet's gleam' and the ‘doubting vans,' and passed through the mystic mistiness of the ‘Suns' poem and learned to brush away some of the ‘fine writing' and find the deeper truth and beauty. Why shouldn't a poet cultivate lucidity? Is poetry any the less poetry for being plain? Doesn't impressionism fail of its mission without poignancy, without saliency, without definite idea?" Poet Ridgely Torrence wrote in the national magazine Critic that "The Testimony of the Suns, by George Sterling, contains some excellent verse. ...Mr. Sterling really gives the impression of a certain largeness of utterance here and there in single lines and purple patches, but he fails in the main seemingly from the lack of a sense of humor. His voice is deeply keyed, but he is prone either to become wordy or sing of the commonplace and trite themes in so mighty a voice and with such a solemn visage that he leads us to smile rather than to wonder with appreciation."

When The Testimony of the Suns and Other Poems was first published, Sterling's poems had appeared in newspapers and magazines for seven years. The Washington Post had published his first important poem, and the prestigious national magazine Harper's Monthly had published another Sterling poem, but "The Testimony of the Suns" marked the first time Sterling's poetry attracted nationwide attention from critics. (Several more "Testimony" reviews appeared but are not quoted in this Wikipedia article.) The critical success of "The Testimony of the Suns" established Sterling's career as a poet. Almost all of Sterling's subsequent books received nationwide attention from magazines and newspapers.

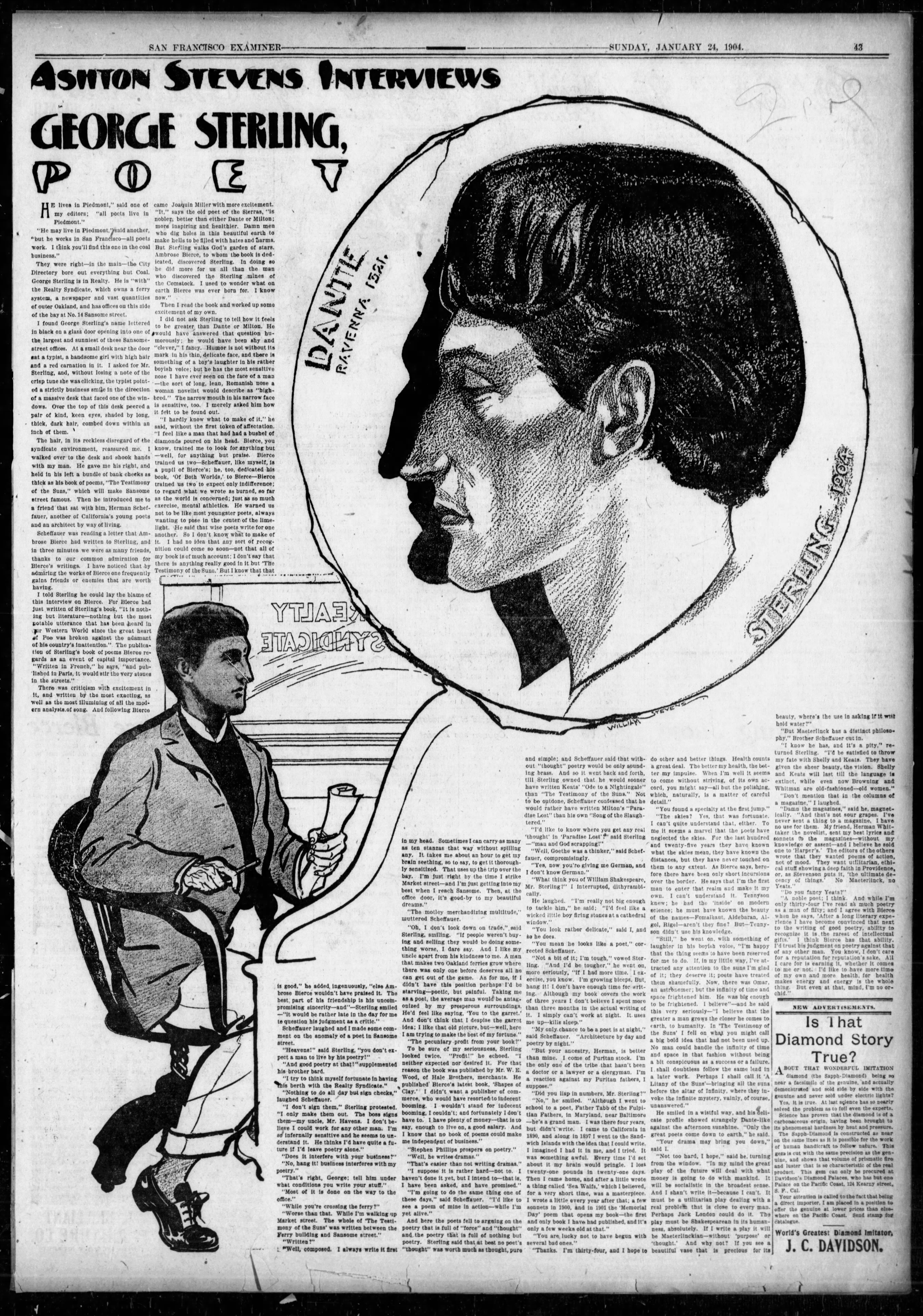
1904 January 24, critic Ashton Stevens interviews George Sterling for the San Francisco Examiner.

The San Francisco Examiner ran a full-page interview of Sterling by eminent critic Ashton Stevens. Two portraits illustrated the interview, one showing Sterling at his desk in the Realty Syndicate offices, the other comparing him to Dante. Sterling explained his feelings about the national critical response: "I feel like a man that had had a bushel of diamonds poured on his head. Bierce, you know, trained me to look for anything but—well, for anything but praise. Bierce trained us two—Scheffauer, like myself, is a pupil of Bierce's; ...to expect only indifference; to regard what we wrote as burned, so far as the world is concerned; just so much exercise, mental athletics. He warned us not to be like most youngster poets, always wanting to pose in the center of the limelight. He said that wise poets write for one another. ...I had no idea that any sort of recognition could come so soon—not that all of my book is of much account; I don't say that there is anything really good in it but ‘The Testimony of the Suns'."

== Unpopularity predicted ==
Some critics admired "The Testimony of the Suns" but accurately predicted that Sterling's poem would not become a popular favorite. In Chicago, one reviewer explained: "...let me commend ‘The Testimony of the Suns,' Sterling's chef d'oeuvre, and recall Ambrose Bierce's magnificent compliment: ‘ ‘The Testimony of the Suns' is nothing but literature—nothing but the greatest poem written in America since the great heart of Poe was broken against the adamant of his country's inattention. Written in France and published in Paris, it would move the very stones in the street.' Quite so, but written in American and published in San Francisco, it has attracted the attention of the infinitesimally few—the few, the happy few, the band of brothers, who really care for art, and recognize it whether the medium be painting, poetry, or our own august mystery. ...The bourgeois—whose idea of a great poet is Riley or Frank Stanton[—]have found Sterling's tremendous achievement above and beyond them. What they want is the jingleman."

A Nevada-based critic agreed, stating in a joint review of Sterling's book and Poems of Both Worlds by Herman George Scheffauer: "...their work is fired over the heads of the masses and so filled with erudition as not to strike the popular fancy. It is the work of the head more than the work of the heart. Such poems are for the learned few and not for the popular middle classes who like the sympathetic verse of Bobbie Burns."

== Criticism after the San Francisco earthquake ==
After the April 18, 1906 San Francisco earthquake and fire, newspapers and magazines across the country published eulogies to the memories of a San Francisco that no longer was. Some mentioned Sterling. In National Magazine, St. Louis editor William Maron Reedy said: "George Sterling wrote there the best book of verse of the last four years, The Testimony of the Suns."

Ambrose Bierce continued to express high regard for "The Testimony of the Suns." In 1907 he wrote: "Of that work I have the temerity to think that in both subject and art it nicks the rock as high as anything of the generation of Tennyson, and a good deal higher than anything of the generation of Kipling ...,"

Alexander Robertson published the third edition of The Testimony of the Suns and Other Poems in late 1907. The editor of Current Literature thought the new edition noteworthy enough to print 24 stanzas from the poem, explaining: "...the title poem, while it is twice as long and thrice as obscure as it ought to be, contains passages of exalted feeling and cosmic thought that nearly sweep one off his feet at times. Briefly put, the testimony of the suns is to the effect that man's life is but a passing incident in the universe and that personal immortality is a vain dream."

Harriet Monroe, the editor of Poetry: A Magazine of Verse, wrote a critical overview of Sterling's first four books. Her review strongly affected Sterling. On "The Testimony of the Suns," she wrote:

"His first long poem, "The Testimony of the Suns," does indeed make one feel the sidereal march, make one shiver before the immensity and shining glory of the universe—this in spite of shameless rhetoric which often threatens to engulf the theme beyond redemption, and in spite of the whole second part, an unhappy afterthought. Already the young poet's brilliant but too facile craftsmanship was tempted by the worst excesses of the Tennysonian tradition: he never thinks—he deems; he does not ask, but craves; he is fain for this and that; he deals in emperies and auguries and antiphons, in causal throes and lethal voids—in many other things of tinsel and fustian, the frippery of a by-gone fashion. ...And yet this is the poet, and this the poem, capable at times of lyric rapture:

O Deep whose very silence stuns!
Where Light is powerless to illume,
Lost in immensities of gloom
That dwarf to motes the flaring suns.

O Night where Time and Sorrow cease!
Eternal magnitude of dark
Wherein Aldebaran drifts a spark,
And Sirius is hushed to peace!

O Tides that foam on strands untrod,
From seas in everlasting prime,
To light where Life looks forth on Time
And Pain, unanswered, questions God!

What Power, with inclusive sweep
And rigor of compelling bars,
Shall curb the furies of the stars,
And still the troubling of that Deep?

"...If I dwell upon this early poem, it is because the best and worst qualities of the poet are in it. His later work never gives us such a hint of grandeur, or falls into deeper abysses of rhetoric. ...The truth is, this sort of pomposity has died the death."

== Late twentieth and early twenty-first century criticism ==
More than three-quarters of a century after "The Testimony of the Suns" first saw daylight, looking at it today enables different perspectives. Is Sterling's poem now merely a historical artifact? Does it still say anything to readers today?

Thomas Benediktsson's 1980 book George Sterling provides the most detailed look at Sterling's star poem to date. After careful examination, Benediktsson decided: "It should be clear by now that "The Testimony of the Suns" has little attraction for the modern reader. It is filled with archaisms and overly ‘sublime' rhetorical effects, and it lacks precise statement of its ideas. ...The second part of the poem especially falls prey to these excesses. In the effort to sustain the grandeur, Sterling allows his stanzas to become strident and nearly hysterical at times, and at other times to become deadly monotonous."

He continued: "Behind the excesses of the rhetoric, however, is the revelation of a cosmic abyss, reinforced by the astronomical theme and leading only to despair. ...Humanity will always seek ‘to know what permanence abides/Beyond the veil the senses draw'. But there will be no revelations: men are trapped in time, and they will ‘crave unanswered.' ...The poem's final statement, then, is of ‘the impotence and eternal loneliness of human beings, involved in some vast and incomprehensible law of cyclic recurrence.' (Lionel Stevenson, "George Sterling's Place in Modern Poetry," University of California Chronicle v. 31 (October 1929), p. 418.) And thus, despite its flaws, ‘The Testimony of the Suns' is historically significant. Along with the then-forgotten poems of Stephen Crane and the still unknown poems of Robinson Jeffers, it is one of the earliest naturalist poems in America. Almost Schopenhauerian in its emphasis upon the primacy of pain, it is in its way a remarkable poem for the ‘twilight interval' in which it was written. Bierce had helped make Sterling into a significant transitional figure—a poet whose nineteenth-century rhetoric and traditional stock of images contrast sharply with [his] very modern sense of despair."

On the other hand, literary historian S. T. Joshi stated: "Whether ‘The Testimony of the Suns' is Sterling's greatest poem is open to question; certainly, it is one of his most impressive. The vibrant depiction of cosmic conflict, although occasionally obscure in sense and diction, is a triumph of the imagination; but Sterling knew that it was not without human significance ...The fundamental message of that second part appears to be the failure of the human mind to find any ‘meaning' in the stars aside from the notion of constant struggle, warfare, and ultimate transience. Since the stars themselves will one day perish, what hope can human beings have of staving off oblivion?"

Poet and critic Donald Sidney-Fryer described the poem as "Very much a product of the fin-de-siècle" and "a striking and grandiose appraisal of the cosmos at large. ...It remains an austere and very sober disquisition on the uncharted and star-strewn immensities of the cosmic-astronomic spaces, as well as the utter indifference of the cosmos at large to human beings and their concerns while residing and evolving on a small and inconspicuous planet circling around an insignificant sun located at the edge of the Milky Way, one galaxy among billions. This long, rather digressive, but certainly impressive poem still represents the strongest statement of cosmic pessimism or nihilism ever penned."

More recently, Writer and critic Joshua Glenn categorized "The Testimony of the Suns" as "Radium Age poetry," described as "A (pro- or anti-) science-, mathematics-, technology-, space-, apocalypse-, dehumanization-, disenchantment-, and/or future-oriented poem published during [science fiction]'s emergent Radium Age (c. 1900–1935)." As an example, Glenn cited the poem's last twelve stanzas, which describe a search for extraterrestrial life and possible colonization of other planets.

In 2022, Spanish literary historian Ariadna García Carreño translated Sterling's book The Testimony of the Suns and Other Poems into Spanish and discussed the star poem in her introduction.
