= Geoffrey Dunn (writer) =

American author

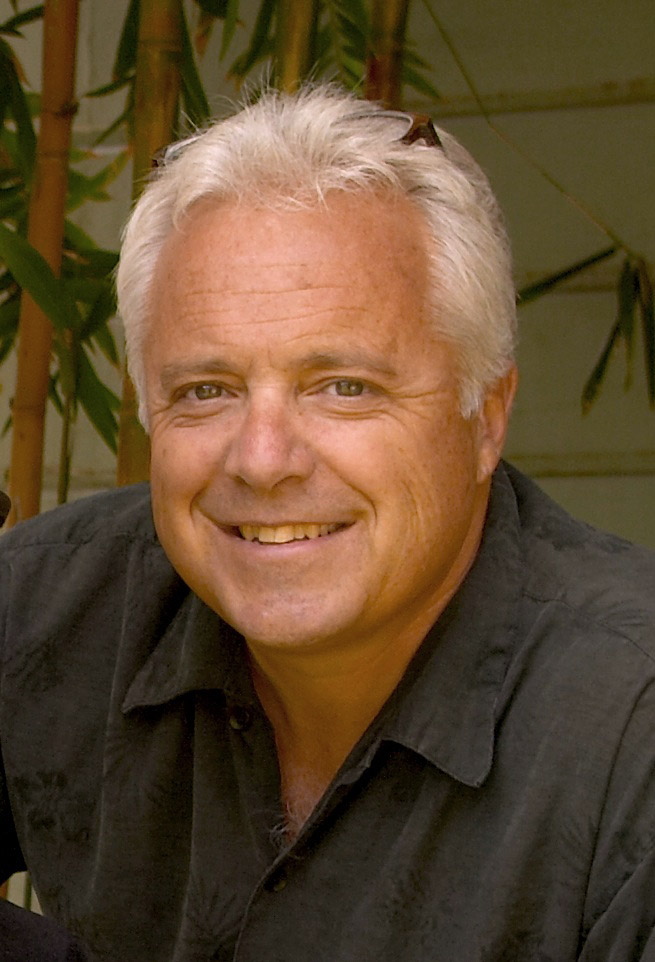
- Dunn in 2005
- Born: Geoffrey Frank Dunn; San Francisco, California, U.S.
- Education: University of California, Santa Cruz
- Occupations: Film producer, film director, author
- Writing career
- Period: 1973–present
- Genres: Nonfiction; Politics; Cultural; Documentary
- Notable awards: Tony Hill Memorial Award; National Newspaper Award

Geoffrey Dunn is an American author, film producer, film director, screenwriter, and investigative journalist. His films include Calypso Dreams, Miss…or Myth?, Dollar a Day, 10¢ a Dance and his books include, The Lies of Sarah Palin: The Untold Story Behind Her Relentless Quest for Power, Chinatown Dreams, and Santa Cruz is in the Heart, Volumes l and ll.

The Lies of Sarah Palin: The Untold Story Behind Her Relentless Quest for Power, written by Dunn in 2011, remained on Amazon's bestsellers list for more than a year and a half.

== Early life and education ==
Geoffrey Frank Dunn was born in San Francisco, California, to parents Frank and Lindy (née Stagnaro) Dunn. He is a fourth-generation descendant of the Stagnaro fishing family from Riva Trigoso, Italy. Dunn graduated from Soquel High School in 1973, where he was captain of his high school baseball team. He received his B.A. in politics with honors in the major and college honors from the University of California, Santa Cruz in 1977. He received an MA and Ph.D. in sociology from the University of Santa Cruz.

== Career ==
=== Filmmaking ===
Dunn began his film career serving as the on-screen narrator in the documentary film, A Day on the Bay in 1980. He later partnered with his principal collaborator Mark Schwartz on several documentary films, including Dollar a Day, 10¢ a Dance; Miss…or Myth? (nominated for the Grand Jury Prize at Sundance, 1988), Mi Vida: The Three Worlds of Maria Gutierrez, Chinese Gold, and Calypso Dreams. He wrote the original screenplay for the feature film Maddalena Z (1989), which was released by Millennium Entertainment as Voyage of the Heart (1990), produced and directed by Schwartz.

=== Writing ===
Dunn was a featured contributor to the HuffPost (formerly The Huffington Post) and served as senior editor for Metro Newspapers where he received awards for investigative journalism from the National Newspaper Association, the California Newspaper Publishers Association, and the Peninsula Press. During the 2000s, he wrote numerous articles on Caribbean Culture for the Trinidad Express Newspapers, including a poem, a response to Nobel Prize-winning poet Derek Walcott's Return of the Spoiler, entitled Sparrow Come Back.

=== Awards ===
Dunn has been the recipient of numerous awards for his work in film, journalism, teaching, and community work. He received an Excellence in Teaching award from the University of California, Santa Cruz in 2000, the Gail Rich Award for Outstanding Contribution to the Arts in 2002, a Lifetime Achievement Award from the Santa Cruz Chamber of Commerce in 2011, and was awarded the Santa Cruz County Artist of the Year award in Santa Cruz, California in 2015. Dunn received the Tony Hill Community Service award from the University of California, Santa Cruz in 2020 in recognition of Outstanding Community Service and Commitment to Building Bridges Among Diverse Groups, which was recognized at the UC Santa Cruz annual Martin Luther King Jr. Convocation.

== Filmography ==
- 2015 - The Glamour Boyz Again: The Mighty Sparrow and Lord Superior on the Hilton Rooftop - Director, co-producer, writer
- 2008 - Calypso Dreams - Writer, co-producer, co-director
- 1993 - A Home Movie Scrapbook - Writer, Director
- 1989 - Voyage of the Heart—Maddalena Z - Screenwriter, Actor
- 1987 – Mi Vida: The Three Worlds of Maria Gutierrez - Writer, co-director
- 1987 - Chinese Gold - Writer, co-director
- 1986 - Miss...or Myth? - Writer, co-director
- 1984 - Dollar a Day, 10¢ a Dance - Writer, co-director
- 1981 - A Day on the Bay

== Books ==
- 2016 – Santa Cruz Wharf
- 2014 - Santa Cruz is in the Heart
- 2013 – Sports of Santa Cruz County
- 2013 - Vintage Bargetto: Celebrating a Century of California Wine (co-author)
- 2011 - The Lies of Sarah Palin: The Untold Story Behind Her Relentless Quest for Power
- 2002 - Chinatown Dreams: The Life and Photographs of George Lee
- 1989 - Santa Cruz is in the Heart (2nd edition 1990, 3rd edition 1995, 4th edition 1998, 5th edition 2003)
