= Joint Army–Navy Assessment Committee =

Joint Army–Navy Assessment Committee (JANAC) was a United States inter-service agency set up to analyze and assess Japanese naval and merchant marine shipping losses caused by U.S. and Allied forces during World War II.

== Background ==
In January 1943, JANAC was formed by General George Marshall, the Chief of Staff of the U.S. Army, and Admiral Ernest J. King, the Chief of Naval Operations and Commander-in-Chief, United States Fleet (COMINCH), to assess enemy naval and merchant shipping losses during World War II. The objectives of JANAC were as set forth in the following joint Army–Navy directive:

By agreement between Chief of Staff and Commander-in-Chief, a Committee composed of 4 Navy and 3 Army members is appointed to meet from time to time at the call of the senior member to study and evaluate reports of loss or damage of enemy Naval and Merchant vessels from all causes, except those cases considered by the Anti-Submarine Warfare Assessment Committee of the Office of the Commander-in-Chief, U.S. Fleet. Findings of the Anti-Submarine Warfare Assessment Committee will be included in the overall evaluation of enemy losses without further review. Periodic reports of the Committee will be submitted jointly to the Chief of Staff and Commander-in-Chief.

JANAC consisted of representatives of the U.S. Navy, the U.S. Army, and the Army Air Forces, with a joint Army–Navy secretariat, under the chairmanship of Rear Admiral Walter S. DeLany. Following the war, Rear Admiral Jerauld Wright succeeded Delany as JANAC chairman.

== Methodology & results ==
JANAC used the following sources to compile information on Japanese vessel losses during World War II:

- Prisoner of War Reports
- Captured Enemy Documents
- United States and Allied Intelligence Sources
- Naval Shipping Control Authority for Japanese Merchant Marine (SCAJAP)
- Ariyoshi's Final List (Japanese)
- Ariyoshi's List (Japanese)
- Shipowners' List (Japanese)
- Naval Ministry List (Japanese)
- United States Mine Warfare Report
- United States and Allied Action Summaries
- United States Photographic Intelligence
- United States Strategic Bombing Survey (USSBS) Reports

The assessment of losses, unanimously agreed to by all JANAC members of the committee, was published in 1947, which included:

- All Naval vessels known or believed to have been lost.
- All merchant vessels of 500 or more gross tons known or believed to have been lost.

JANAC provided a detailed chronology of Japanese naval and merchant marine losses cross-indexed in the appendix of its final report, including a separate summary about losses caused by U.S. submarines. JANAC noted that a negligible number of vessels were not assessed because of insufficient information as to the cause of loss.

Sinking Agent	Naval Vessels		Merchant Vessels		Total Vessels	
Sinking Agent	No.	Tonnage	No.	Tonnage	No.	Tonnage
TOTALS:	686	1,965,646	2,346	8,618,109	3,032	10,583,755
United States (U.S.):	611	1,822,210	2,117	7,913,858	2,728	9,736,068
Submarines	201	540,192	1,113	4,779,902	1,314	5,320,094
Surface Warships	112	277,817	11	43,349	123	321,166
Army Aircraft	70	62,165	240	639,667	310	701,832
Carrier Aircraft	161	711,236	359	1,390,241	520	2,101,477
Land-based Navy-Marine Aircraft	11	13,402	88	218,718	99	232,120
Army-Navy-Marine Aircraft	9	48,750	23	114,306	32	163,056
Navy Shore Batteries	2	2,770	—	—	2	2,770
Mines	19	17,995	247	591,660	266	609,655
Aircraft and Other Agents	26	147,883	32	132,710	58	280,593
Unknown Agents	—	—	4	3,305	4	3,305
Allied Forces:	45	69,636	73	211,664	118	281,300
United Kingdom (U.K.)	28	50,365	42	87,981	70	138,346
Netherlands	7	8,099	15	57,471	22	65,570
Australia	5	6,892	8	24,910	13	31,802
China	—	—	3	14,327	3	14,327
Soviet Union	2	1,660	2	8,233	4	9,893
New Zealand	2	2,095	—	—	2	2,095
Netherlands and Australia	—	—	2	8,303	2	8,303
Netherlands and India	—	—	1	10,439	1	10,439
Australia and India	1	525	—	—	1	525
U.S. and Allied Forces:	10	14,864	12	57,923	22	72,787
U.S. and Australia	4	7,550	7	37,072	11	44,622
U.S., Australia, and Netherlands	—	—	2	16,362	2	16,362
U.S. and U.K.	5	5,102	2	3,500	7	8,602
U.S. and New Zealand	1	2,212	—	—	1	2,212
U.S., U.K., and Netherlands	—	—	1	989	1	989
Marine Casualties:	13	50,338	97	268,948	110	319,286

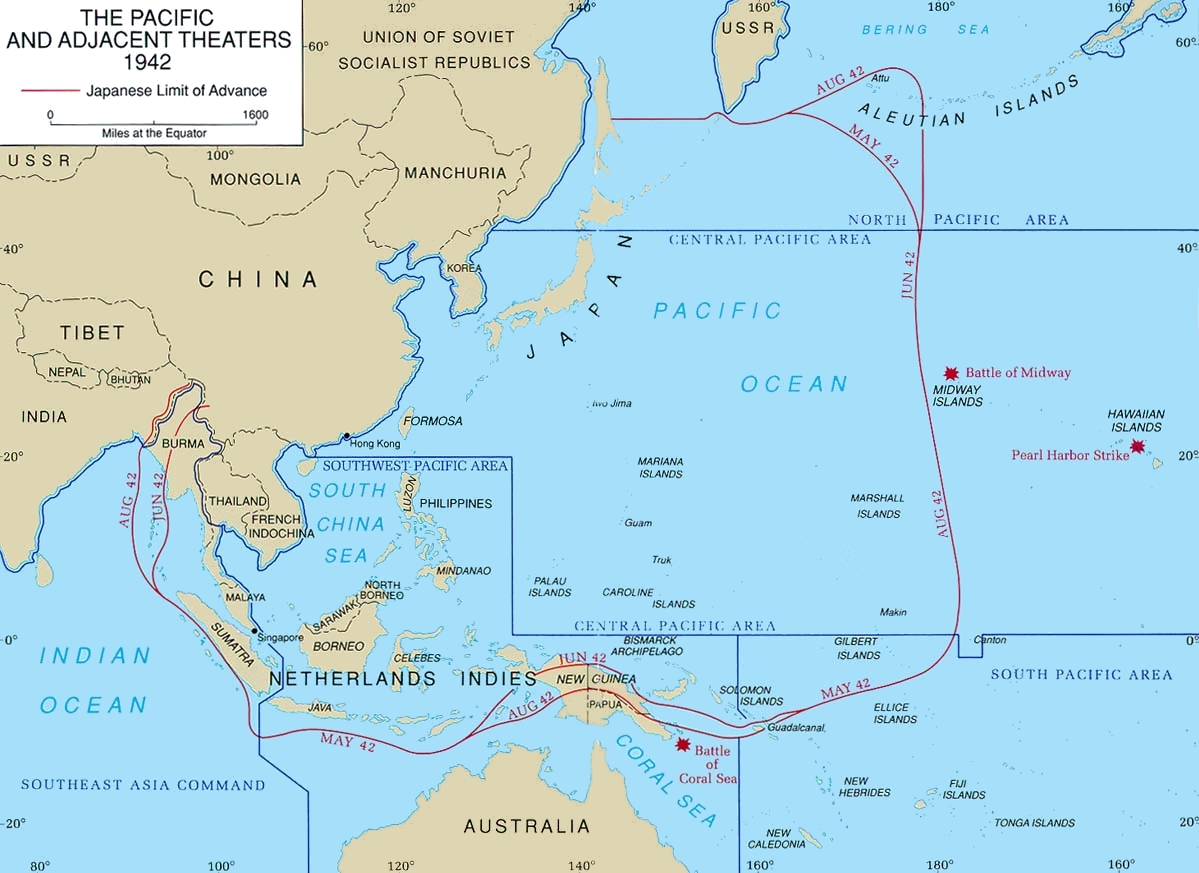
Pacific Theater of Operation (PTO)

Japanese Naval and Merchant Shipping Losses by the Allied forces

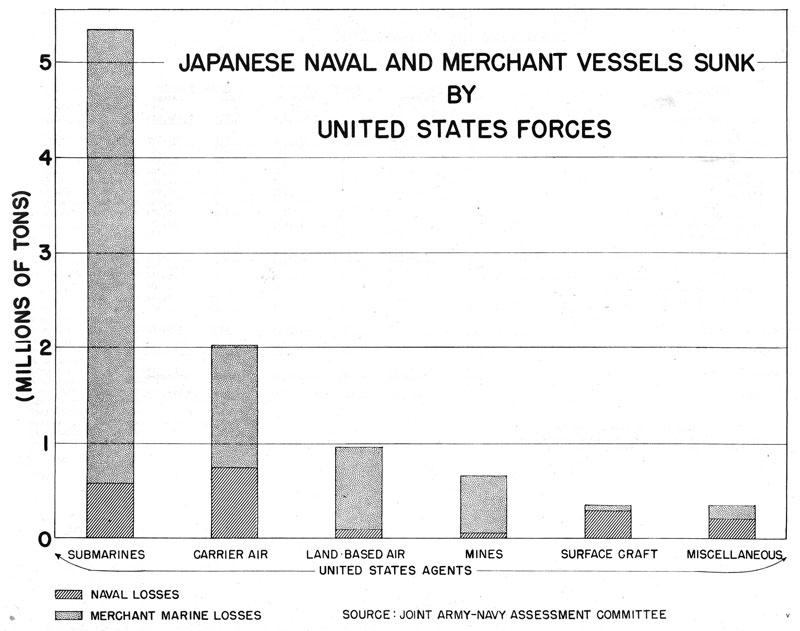
Japanese Naval and Merchant Shipping Losses by U.S. forces

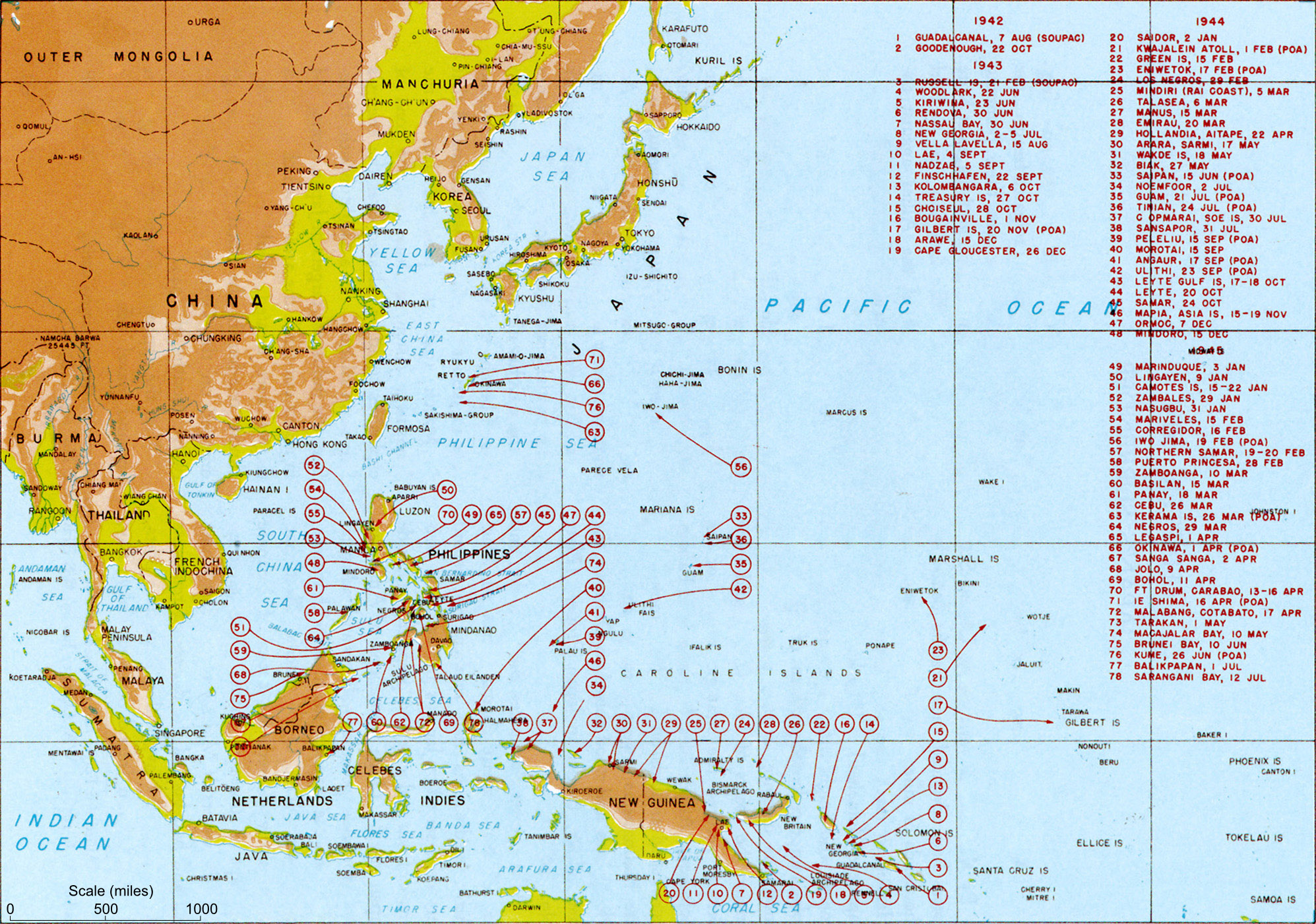
PTO naval campaign

== Legacy ==
=== Submarine service ===
JANAC significantly altered wartime estimates for Japanese losses inflicted by the U.S. Navy's submarine service. At the end of World War II, Vice Admiral Charles A. Lockwood and his COMSUBPAC staff had estimated that approximately 4,000 ships had been sunk, totalling 10 million tons lost. JANAC revised this total to 1,314 enemy vessels and 5.3 million tons sunk. JANAC estimates of Japanese losses revised wartime claims downward for most war patrols carried out by the submarine service during World War II as noted in the following table of the revised list of top ten submarines based upon the total tonnage sunk as determined by JANAC.

Ship	JANAC figures			Wartime Estimates		
Ship	War Patrols	Ships Sunk	Tonnage	Ships Sunk	Tonnage	Tonnage Ratio
Flasher (SS-249)	6	21 1/2	104,564	23 1/2	153,800	0.65
Rasher (SS-269)	8	18	99,901	19	137,200	0.73
Barb (SS-220)	12	17 1/3	97,579	28	197,900	0.48
Tang (SS-306)	5 (lost)	24	93,824	31	227,324	0.41
Silversides (SS-236)	14	23	90,080	26	143,700	0.63
Spadefish (SS-411)	5	21	88,091	21	122,790	0.63
Trigger (SS-237)	12 (lost)	18 1/3	89,892	25⅓	183,900	0.47
Drum (SS-228)	13	15	80,580	19	118,000	0.68
Jack (SS-259)	9	15	76,687	17	115,000	0.67
Snook (SS-279)	9 (lost)	17	75,473	16	105,800	0.71

JANAC also revised the achievements of individual submarine commanding officers as noted in the following table.

Commanding Officer	JANAC figures			Wartime Estimates		
Commanding Officer	War Patrols	Ships Sunk	Tonnage	Ships Sunk	Tonnage	Tonnage Ratio
Richard H. O'Kane	5	24	93,824	31	227,800	0.41
Slade D. Cutter	4	19	71,729	21	142,300	0.51
Dudley W. Morton	6 (killed in action)	19	54,683	17	100,000	0.55
Eugene B. Fluckey	5	16 1/3	95,360	25	179,900	0.53
Samuel D. Dealey	6 (killed in action)	16	54,002	20 1/2	82,500	0.65
Reuben T. Whitaker	5	14 1/2	60,846	18 1/2	111,500	0.55
Gordon W. Underwood	3	14	75,386	14	89,600	0.81
Royce L. Gross	7	14	65,736	13 1/2	80,500	0.82
Charles O. Triebel	8	14	58,837	13	83,330	0.71
John S. Coye Jr.	6	14	38,659	14	71,700	0.54

Although JANAC tended to revise downward wartime estimates, one noteworthy exception involved the fifth war patrol of Archerfish (SS-311) under the command of Commander Joseph F. Enright. Archerfish was credited with sinking a 24,000-ton Hiyō-class aircraft carrier during the war, but JANAC determined he had actually sunk the 66,000-ton carrier Shinano, making this the most successful submarine patrol of the Pacific War.

=== Battle of Midway ===
JANAC also addressed wartime claims made by the U.S. Army Air Force regarding the sinking of the Japanese aircraft carriers Kaga, Akagi, Hiryū, and Sōryū during the Battle of Midway by giving sole credit to the U.S. Navy.

== See also ==
- Allied submarines in the Pacific War
- Strategic Bombing Survey

== Bibliography ==
=== Primary Sources ===
- Joint Army–Navy Assessment Committee (JANAC) (1947), Japanese Naval and Merchant Shipping Losses During World War II by All Causes, Washington DC: U.S. Government Printing Office, NAVEXOS P-468
- Special Research History – Navy Department Library – Naval Historical Center:
  - SRH-163 - Joint Army–Navy Assessment Committee (JANAC), Miscellaneous Memoranda, 1943–1947
  - SRH-164 - Memoranda from COMINCH, (F-20) to Joint Army–Navy Assessment Committee (JANAC), 1944–1945
  - SRH-165 - Memoranda from Office of Naval Communications to Joint Army–Navy Assessment Committee (JANAC), 1943–1944
  - SRH-166 - Joint Army–Navy Assessment Committee (JANAC), Memoranda to Office of Naval Communication
  - SRH-167 - Memoranda from Army Signal Corps to Joint Army–Navy Assessment Committee (JANAC), 1945–1946
  - SRH-168 - Agenda Minutes/Assessments, Joint Army–Navy Assessment Committee (JANAC)

=== Secondary Sources ===
- Clay Blair Jr. Silent Victory: The U.S. Submarine War Against Japan (Philadelphia: Lippincott, 1975) ISBN 1-55750-217-X (Paperback)
- David M. Key Jr. Admiral Jerauld Wright: Warrior among Diplomats (Manhattan, Kansas: Sunflower University Press, 2001) ISBN 0-89745-251-8
- Roscoe, Theodore (1949). United States Submarine Operations in World War II. Annapolis, Maryland: United States Naval Institute.
