= United States Submarine Operations in World War II =

1949 history book by Theodore Roscoe

- Author: Theodore Roscoe
- Illustrator: Frederic William “Fred” Freeman
- Language: English
- Subject: U.S. submarine campaign against the Japanese Empire
- Genre: Military History
- Publisher: United States Naval Institute
- Publication date: 1949
- Publication place: United States
- Media type: Print (hardcover)
- Pages: 577 pp (first edition)
- Followed by: United States Destroyer Operations in World War II

United States Submarine Operations in World War II by Theodore Roscoe is a classic history of the role of the United States Navy submarines in World War II, earning him the title of "grandfather" of World War II American Submarine historiography. Because the book was written shortly after the war, later scholars have found errors or omissions in its facts. Nevertheless, the book's sweeping narrative maintains it as a classic text in the American submarine force; excerpts are often read at ceremonies where submariners earn their Submarine Warfare insignia.

After World War II, John M. Will of the US Navy Bureau of Personnel hired Roscoe to reduce Richard Voge's 1,500-page Operational History of the submarine war to publishable size. His resulting book was published in 1949 by the U.S. Naval Institute, Annapolis, Maryland. "It is a truncated version of the Operational History (sometimes reproduced word for word)...the Operational History in more manageable form." The work was further condensed in paperback by Bantam Books as Pig Boats: The True Story of the Fighting Submarines of World War II.

== Blair vs. Roscoe ==
In 1975 Clay Blair Jr. authored Silent Victory (see references). Silent Victory was acclaimed by Ned Beach as "an extraordinary book...the definitive submarine history." Written by a competent professional historian a generation apart from Roscoe's work, each book casts reflections upon the other. At the end of each narrative, both authors appended tables of the history of World War 2 from the individual submarine perspective.

=== General ===
Blair's Appendices E and F, organized chronologically by submarine patrol, include the departure point for each patrol, its start month, submarine commanding officer, patrol duration, wartime assessed ships and tonnage sunk (usually as made by Vice Admiral Charles A. Lockwood), post-war JANAC-assessed ships and tonnage sunk, the applicable patrol area, with minimal footnotes about the involvement in any special missions the submarine might be undertaking, and footnotes that indicate shared-credit sinkings.

The ultimate JANAC assessments were about 50% of Admiral Lockwood's post-patrol judgement, as relayed to him by the commanding officers. The reasons are various:

- Not every vessel that was hit sank.
- Not every vessel that sank was the one intended. Crossing merchantmen (Marus) and escorts might put themselves in the way of a torpedo.
- A torpedo that missed might hit a farther-on vessel by chance.
- Optimistic reporting by participants.

Richard O'Kane, famous commander of USS Tang (SS-306), asserted that a typographical error in his fourth patrol report gave Tang JANAC-credit for sinking a small escort vessel five miles away from the large maru she did sink.

Roscoe's tables are organized alphabetically by submarine, giving the date and name of each sinking, its size and location, and the commanding officer at the time. He has additional tables that give greater details of the special missions; and he has a table that lists the vessels sunk in combined attacks, either by multiple submarines, or submarines in concert with land-based aircraft, or submarines in concert with carrier-based aircraft, to the same level of detail as the by-submarine entries

=== Special Missions ===
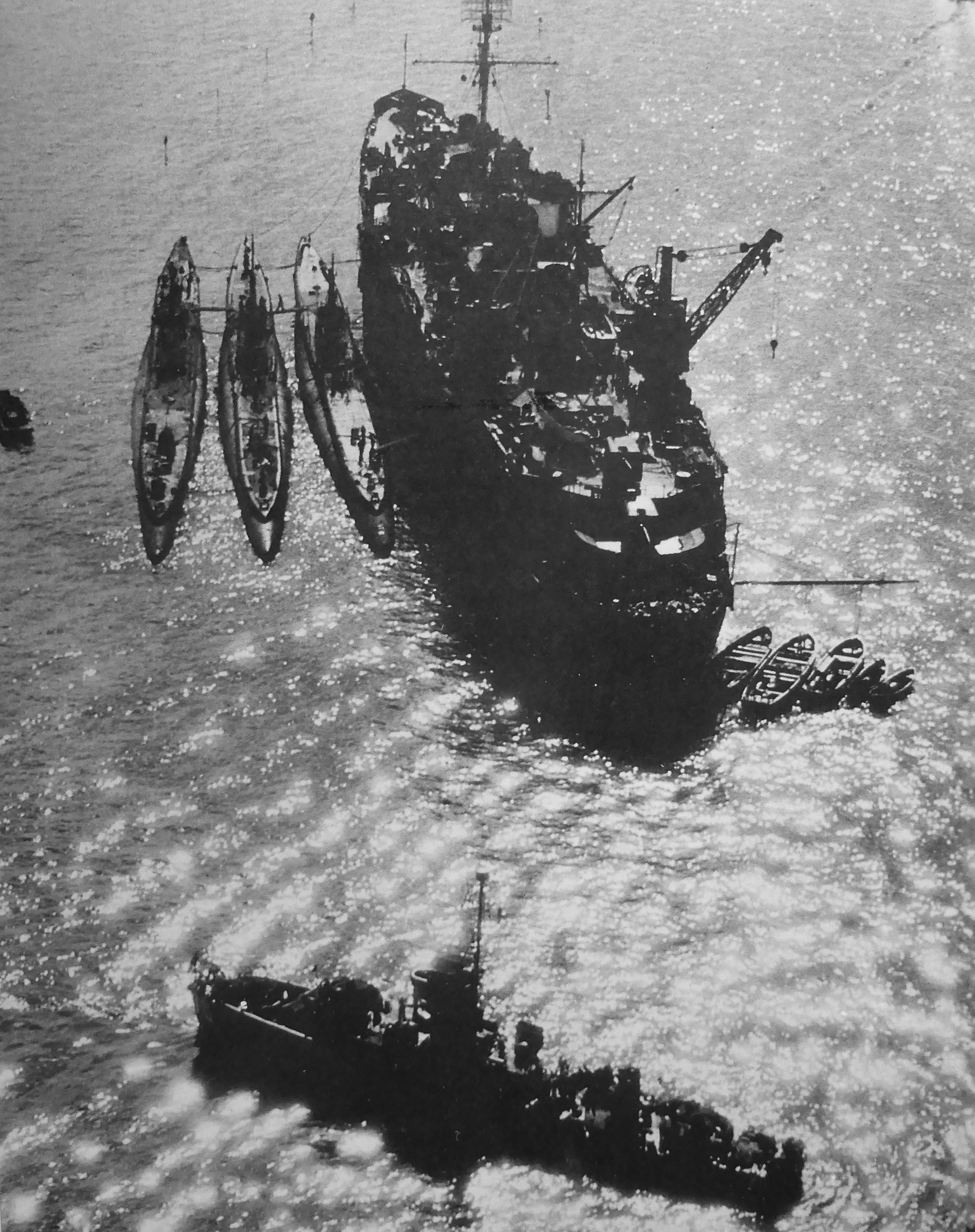
USS Bushnell (AS-15) photo from United States Submarine Operations In World War II.

In highlighting the difference in specificity between Blair and Roscoe concerning special submarine missions, here are two examples.

Noting USS Trout (SS-202) assistance during the Battle of Corregidor:

- Blair: January 1942; Frank W. Fenno, Jr.; Corregidor
- Roscoe: 3 Feb '42 (Lt. Cdr. F. W. Fenno, Jr) Delivered 3500 rounds of 3" AA to Corregidor. Evacuated 20 tons of Philippine gold and silver plus securities and mail

Noting USS Nautilus (SS-168) assistance to the Makin Island raid:

- Blair: August 1942; William H. Brockman, Jr.; Makin Island raid
- Roscoe: 16–18 August '42 (Lt. Cdr. W. H. Brockman, Jr.) Carried portion of "Carlson's" Marine Raiders on Makin Island raid. Supported it with gunfire and sank 2 ships in lagoon.

In no case does Blair match the specificity of Roscoe.

=== Tabulations ===
For Blair, in "some instances, both wartime credits and postwar credits are rounded off to the nearest 100 tons." Roscoe provides an accurate transcription of the JANAC report, the same as found in Voge's Operational History. On the other hand, Blair introduces partial credit for ships sunk in cooperative engagements, and while Roscoe gives a table of such occurrences, he makes no special use of its information.

Where rounding or partial credit are injected, Blair's tabulations and Roscoe's transcription do not reconcile. A prominent example is that of USS Flasher (SS-249), acclaimed by both as the tonnage "champion" of World War 2. On 26 July 1944, Flasher, in concert with USS Crevalle (SS-291), sank the Tosan Maru, a passenger-cargo ship of 8,666 tons. Flasher's share is 4,333 tons, a number inferred by Roscoe and made use of by Blair. Comparing the two evaluations yields the following table.

	Blair's JANAC Credited Ships	Blair's JANAC Credited Tonnage	Roscoe's JANAC Credited Ships	Roscoe's JANAC Credited Tonnage	Inclusive JANAC Credited Ships	Inclusive JANAC Credited Tonnage
Flasher-1	4.0	10,528	4.0	10,528	4.0	10,528
Flasher-2	3.0	6,709	3.0	6,759	3.0	6,759
Flasher-3	4.5	24,949	4.0	20,616	4.5	24,949
Flasher-4	3.0	18,610	3.0	18,610	3.0	18,610
Flasher-5	6.0	42,800	6.0	42,868	6.0	42,868
Flasher-6	1.0	850	1.0	850	1.0	850
Totals	21.5	104,446	21.0	100,231	21.5	104,564

Note Blair's typographical error for Patrol 2, the use of partial credit for Patrol 3 with 4,333 tons above Roscoe, and the rounding in Patrol 5. While the proper summation for Flasher may be 104,564 tons, 4,333 tons above the long recognized and accepted value of Roscoe's 100,231 tons, Blair sums to neither. These errors occur and are understandable in the 29 times combination sinkings occur. Blair's occasional choice to round in "some instances" make his JANAC tabulations not reconcile with the record. Blair does, however, include other Axis vessels sunk and confirmed in his tables. This does not happen in JANAC and Roscoe.

=== Narrative ===
At one-third the size of Voge's Operational History (577 pages vs. 1500-plus) Roscoe inherits Voge's problems:

Generally, it tells a positive story; the "skipper problem," [mal-performance] for example, is not dealt with. However, the torpedo section contains a long and frank account of torpedo problems.

On the other hand, Silent Victory, being 26 years later, lives up to the rest of Beach's acclaim, and shows that it was the work of a professional vice occasional historian :

Most importantly, Silent Victory does not shy away from full and complete treatment of the controversial aspects of our submarine campaign: our lousy torpedoes, the discrepancy between claimed and confirmed sinkings, the professional disputations between force commanders. If there is anything left out, I certainly do not know what it is, for this book gives the whole scene, the good and the bad, the heroes and the failures, the eager and the reluctant.

=== Appendices and Addenda ===
The following addenda are in Roscoe as ordered:

- Submarines Lost [list; after the list, Roscoe included Leslie Nelson Jennings' poem "Lost Harbor."]
- Submarine Losses [map]
- Presidential Unit Citations
- Navy Unit Citations
- Submarine Wolf-packs
- Submarine Tenders in the Pacific War
- Submarine Special Missions Chronology
- Statistical Summary: Attrition War Against Japanese Merchant Marine
- Table: Japanese Merchant Ship Losses (All Causes)
- Submarine Leaders (Ships and Tonnage Sunk)
- Japanese Naval and Merchant Shipping Sunk by U.S. Submarines [JANAC]
- Sunk by Combinations of U.S. Submarines [JANAC]
- Sunk by U.S. Submarines and Navy Carrier-based Aircraft [JANAC]
- Sunk by U.S. Submarines and Land-based Aircraft [JANAC]

The following appendices are in Blair as lettered:

1. World War II Submarine Squadron Commanders, Pacific
2. World War II Submarine Skippers Selected to Flag Rank
3. Postwar Commanders of Submarines Atlantic Fleet
4. Postwar Commanders of Submarines Pacific Fleet
5. Submarine War Patrols, Atlantic
6. Submarine War Patrols, Pacific
7. Top Skippers of World War II
8. Best War Patrols by Numbers of Ships Sunk
9. Best War Patrols by Tonnage of Ships Sunk
10. Top Submarines by Number of Ships Sunk
11. Top Submarines by Tonnage of Ships Sunk
12. Submarine Losses in World War II

=== Maps, Charts, Graphs and Diagrams ===
Roscoe provides 20 maps, graphs, and diagrams; and 11 charts. The charts are two-page foldouts.

Blair provides 37 maps, none of which fold out. This is a significant difference since Submarine Operations is an 8½ inch by 11 inch book, and Silent Victory is 6½ by 9½.

=== Photographs and Illustrations ===
Blair provides 32 pages of pictures. Roscoe provides 15 illustrations such at the top of this article, the back of each illustration is a page (twice the size of Blair's) of photographs. There are several common pictures, most notably the one shown on the Amazon link below. Roscoe provides his pictures to the public domain.

The photographs in [Submarine Operations] were collected from various sources. Most of them are official Navy photographs by official Navy photographers. Many were taken by the famous Steichen Photographic Unit under the direction of Captain Edward Steichen, USNR. Some were taken through periscopes or on deck by amateur photographers of the Submarine Service. A few are from the private collections of submariners with their own cameras—pictures released to their owners after the war. Space does not permit a complete listing of credits. One way or another, the photographs are all Navy pictures.

=== Indices and Sources ===
Roscoe's index is sparse, at 10 pages. Blair's index is 64 pages, well beyond Roscoe's even adjusting for page size, having over 2000 entries. Blair has 13 pages of source discussion, Roscoe has one (Voge's Operational History).

== About Richard Voge ==
Rear Admiral Richard G. Voge, USN, had his submarine USS Sealion (SS-195) sunk beneath him at Cavite, Philippine Islands on 10 December 1941. He became the Submarines Pacific Operations Officer who planned the operations that are the subjects of both books. Given the job by Admiral Lockwood to write the Official Administrative and Operational History for submarines, he produced "Submarine Commands, Volumes 1 and 2." He is the sole source for Roscoe, and the seminal source for Blair:

The Operational History produced by Voge et al. is a massive document of more than 1500 pages dealing with every conceivable operational aspect of the submarine war. No one attempting a serious submarine history should begin without consulting it.
