= List of memorials to George Sterling =

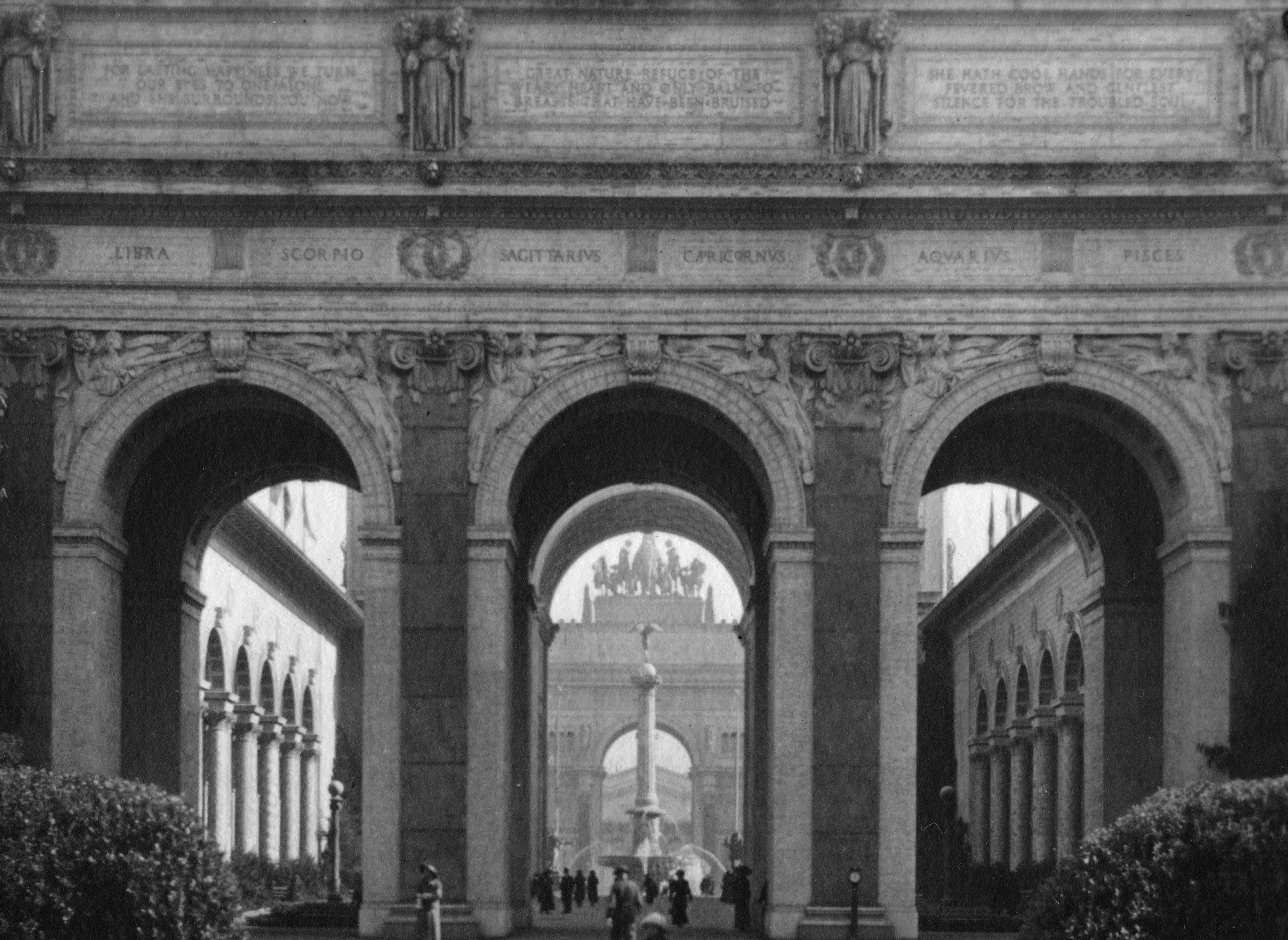
Poetry by George Sterling on 3 panels above arches in Court of Four Seasons, 1915 Panama-Pacific International Exposition world's fair, San Francisco.

Memorials to American poet and playwright George Sterling (1869–1926) include a World War II ship named after him, sculptures portraying him, paintings of him and his works, streets named after him, George Sterling Park in San Francisco, memorial magazine issues dedicated to Sterling, memorial poems, monuments displaying his poetry, and Sterling's grave in Oakland, California.

== Liberty Ship S. S. George Sterling ==
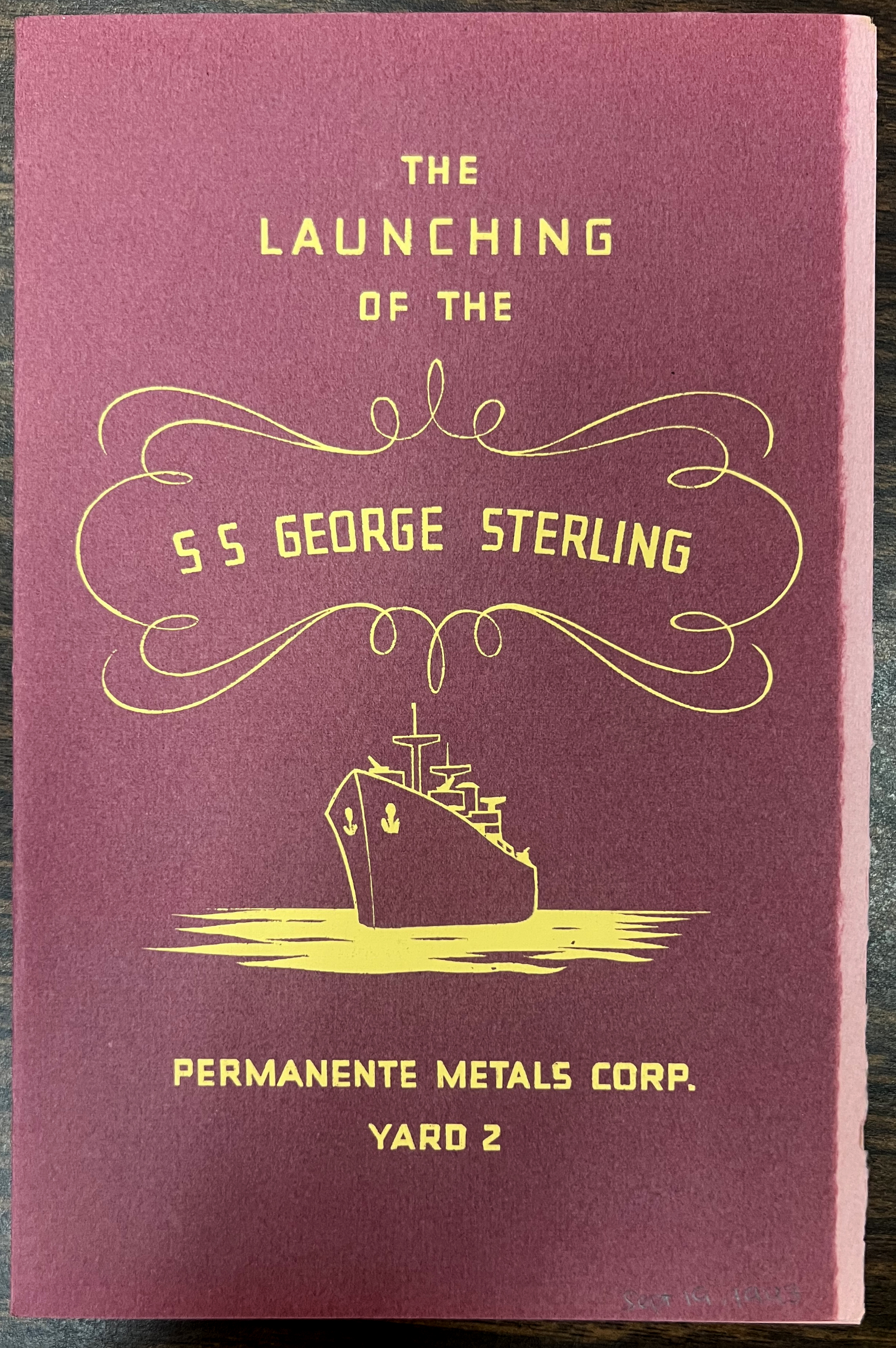
Program for Sept. 19, 1943 launch of United States liberty ship SS George Sterling.

* During World War II, the Liberty ship SS George Sterling (MC hull no. 2152) was launched September 19, 1943 at Permanente Metals Corp. shipyard 2 in Richmond, California. Novelist and critic Elizabeth Janeway sponsored the christening ceremony and was keynote speaker. Other participants in the launching ceremony included Clay Patrick Bedford, the vice president and general manager of Kaiser Industries; musical group the Harmonettes, who performed songs by Sterling; Hilda Caylor, the wife of San Francisco News columnist Arthur Caylor; Mrs. Mark Woolstencroft; and Commander F. T. Barkman, U.S.N.

== Sculptures ==
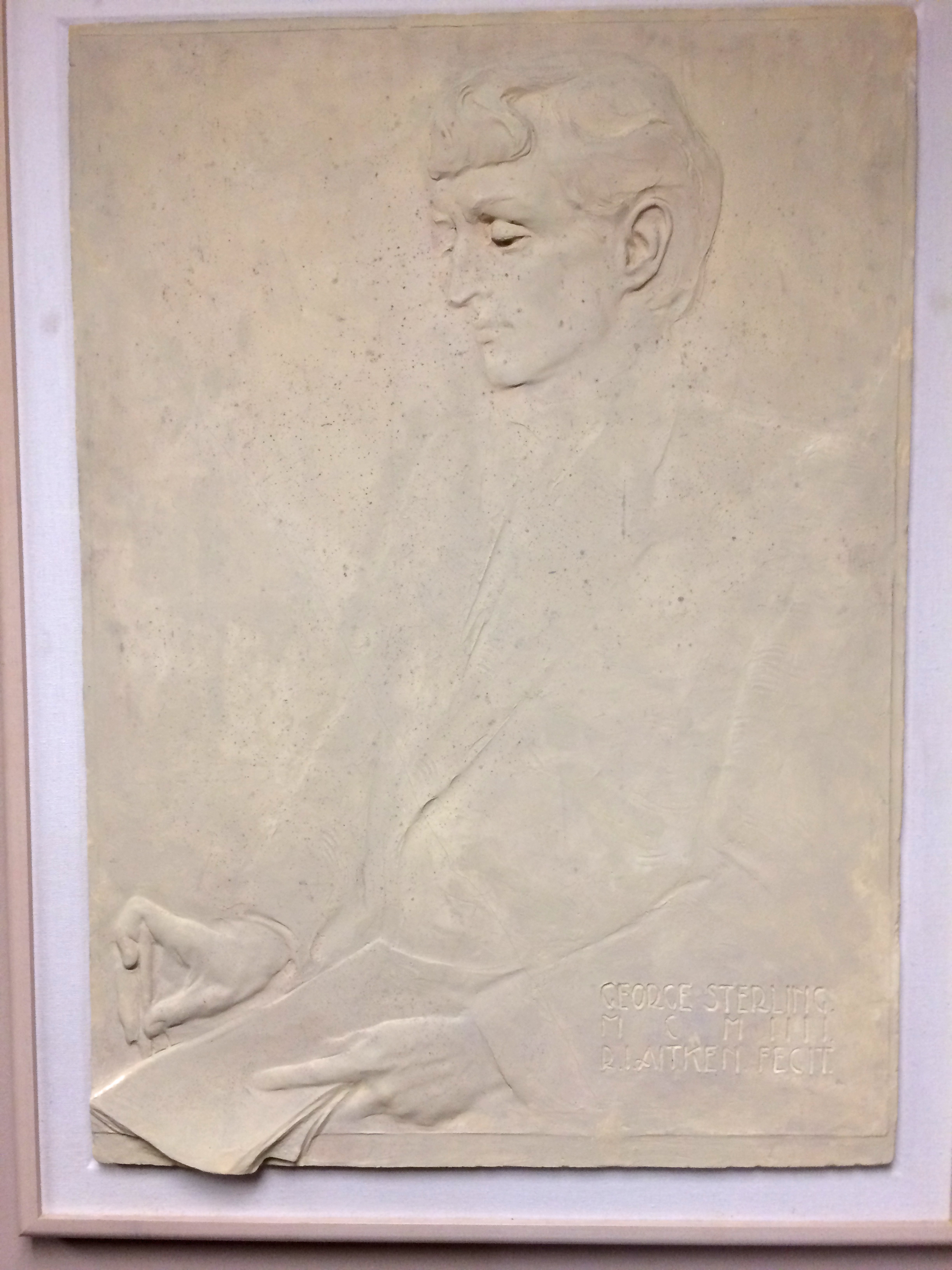
1904 Robert Ingersoll Aitken bas relief sculpture of poet George Sterling.

=== "George Sterling" (1904) by Robert Ingersoll Aitken ===
Best known for his sculptures on the United States Supreme Court building, Aitken carved a bas relief portrait of Sterling for display at the 1904 St. Louis World's Fair. This sculpture is on permanent display in the Harrison Memorial Library's Henry Meade Williams Local History Department in Carmel-by-the-Sea, California.

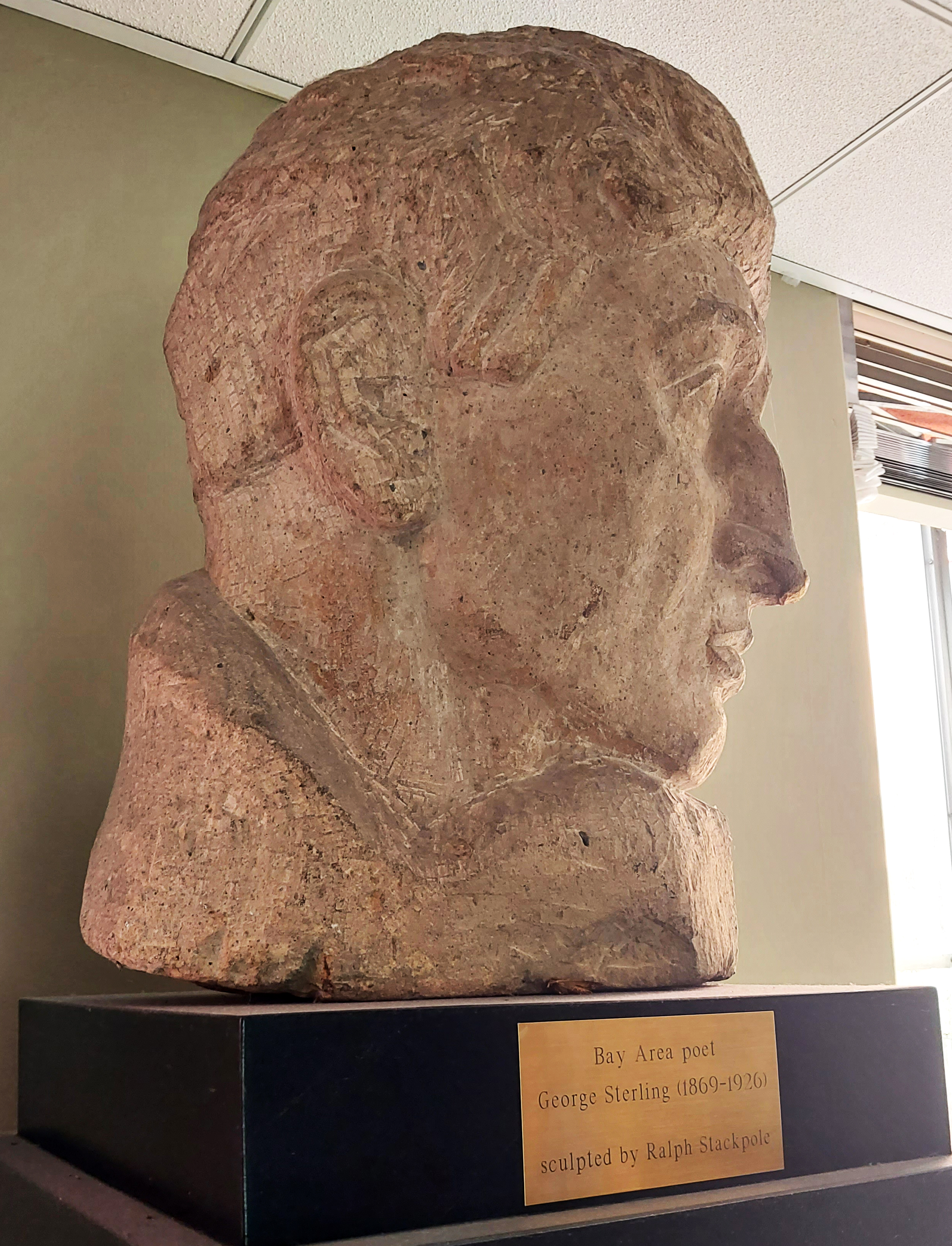
Twice-lifesized bust of George Sterling by Ralph Stackpole, permanently displayed in Dwinelle Hall, University of California, Berkeley.

=== "Head of George Sterling" (completed 1925, first exhibited 1930) by Ralph Stackpole ===
In 1921, Sterling sat for sculptor-painter Stackpole, whom Kenneth Rexroth called "San Francisco's leading artist". Stackpole first sculpted a plaster of paris model, then carved a block of either tufa limestone or volcanic tuff into a two-foot-tall head of Sterling. When first publicly displayed in 1930, Stackpole's bust won the San Francisco Art Association's award of First Prize for Best Sculpture. Art critic Gobind Behari Lal, who had known Sterling, wrote: "Those who knew Sterling's character, and power, feel that he is alive again in this stone." Three years later, "Head of George Sterling" was exhibited at the Museum of Modern Art in New York. Today "Head of George Sterling" is on display on Level C in Dwinelle Hall at the University of California, Berkeley. The sculpture is dirty and needs restoration.

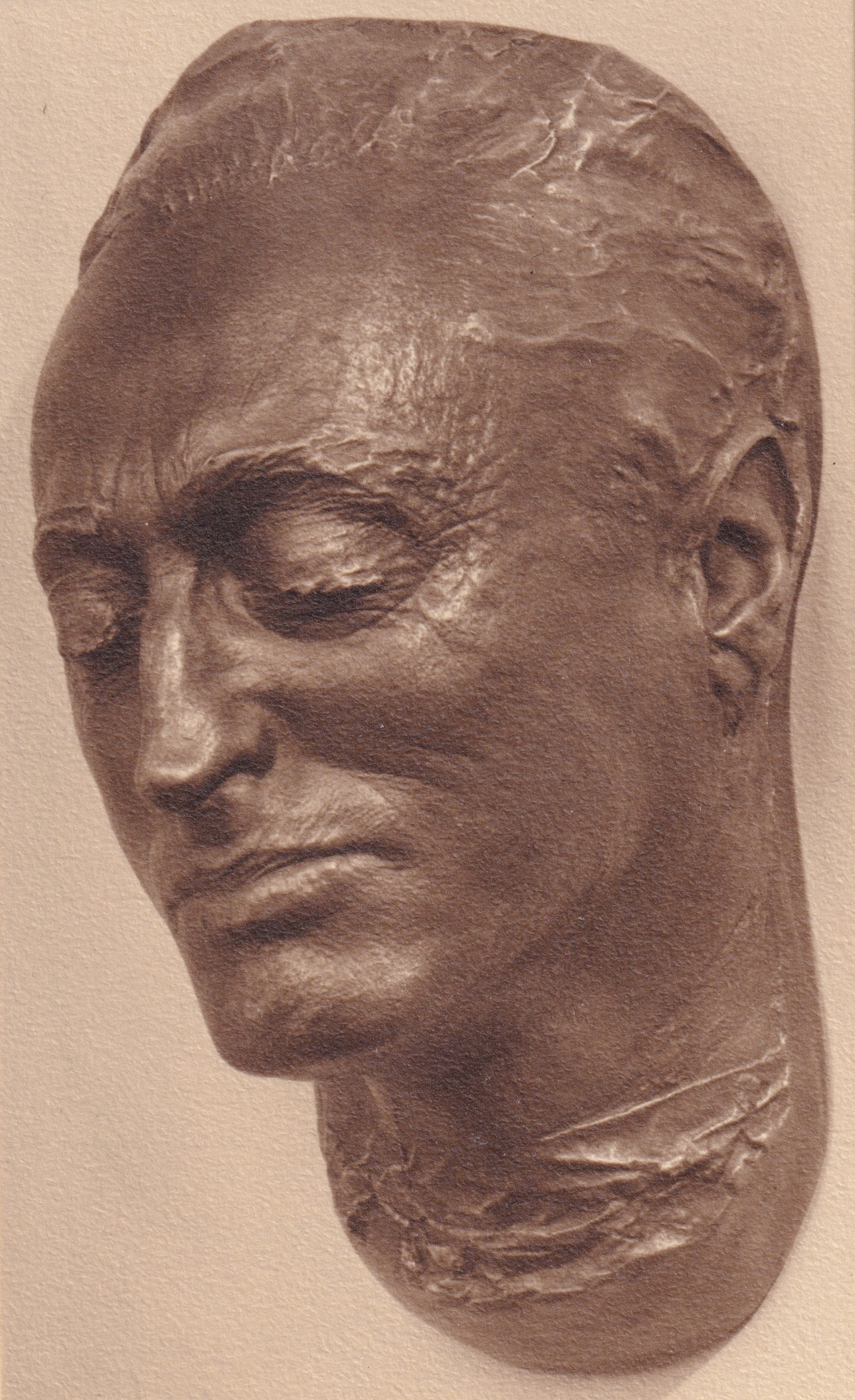
Bronze death mask of George Sterling by Haig Patigian Nov. 17, 1926 after Sterling's suicide.

=== "George Sterling Death Mask" (1926) by Haig Patigian ===
Immediately after Sterling's 1926 suicide, sculptor Patigian obtained permission from the manager of the mortuary where Sterling's body was stored to mold a death mask of Sterling. The death mask was cast in bronze by Herman Steinbrunn of Palo Alto. One bronze death mask is on permanent display near the librarian's desk in the Bohemian Club Library, San Francisco. A second bronze mask is in the collection of the Carmel public library's Henry Meade Williams Local History Department.

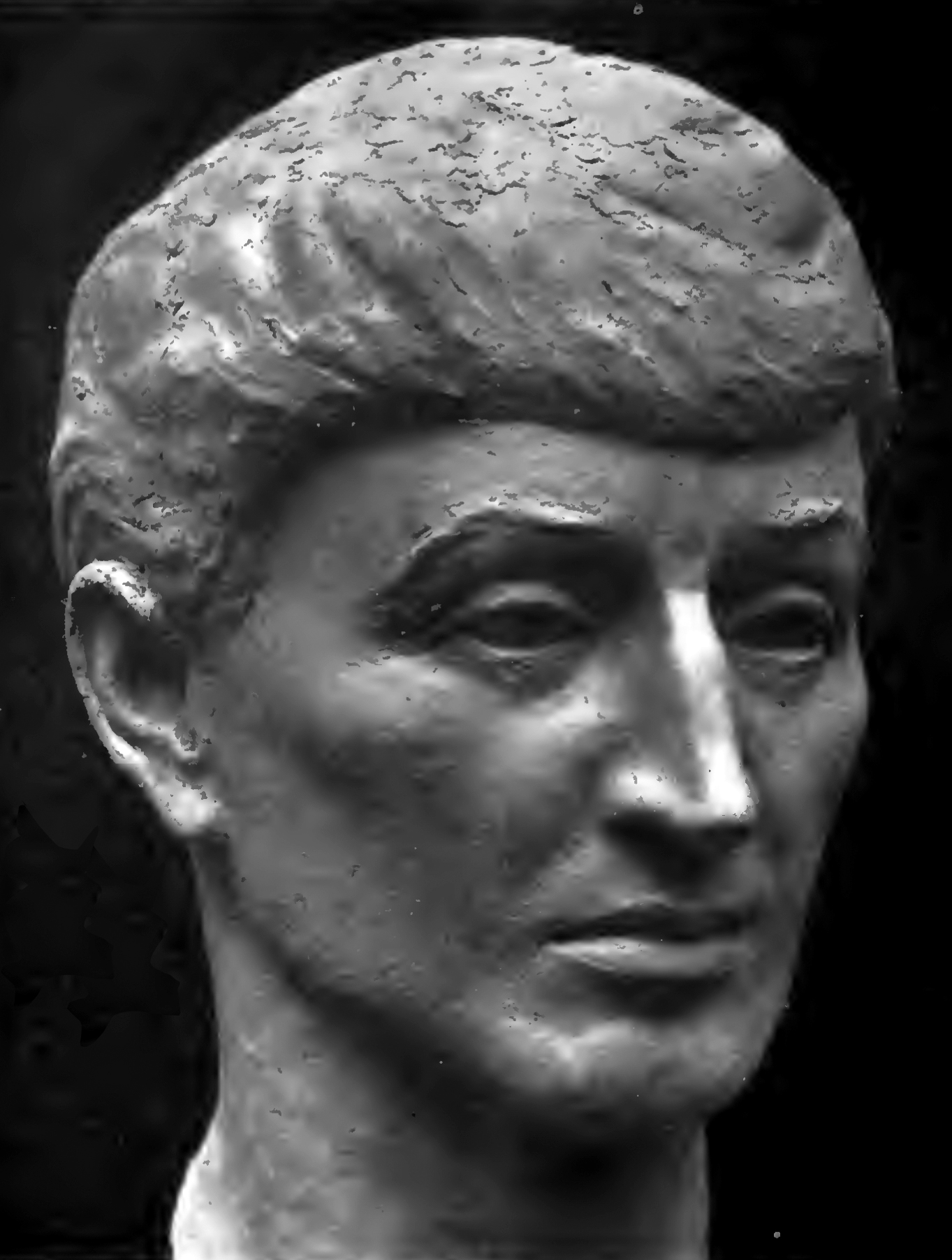
Sculpture of poet and playwright George Sterling by Ward Montague, circa 1926-1927.

=== "George Sterling" (circa 1926–1927) by Ward Montague ===
Sculptor and painter Ward Montague (1898–1987) worked with Ralph Stackpole and Diego Rivera. Inspired by Johan Hagemeyer's 1926 portrait photographs of Sterling (and possibly by seeing his friend Stackpole's "Head of George Sterling"), Montague carved a portrait head of the poet. It was photographed for the December, 1927 Sterling memorial issue of Overland Monthly. This sculpture's current location is unknown.

== Places ==
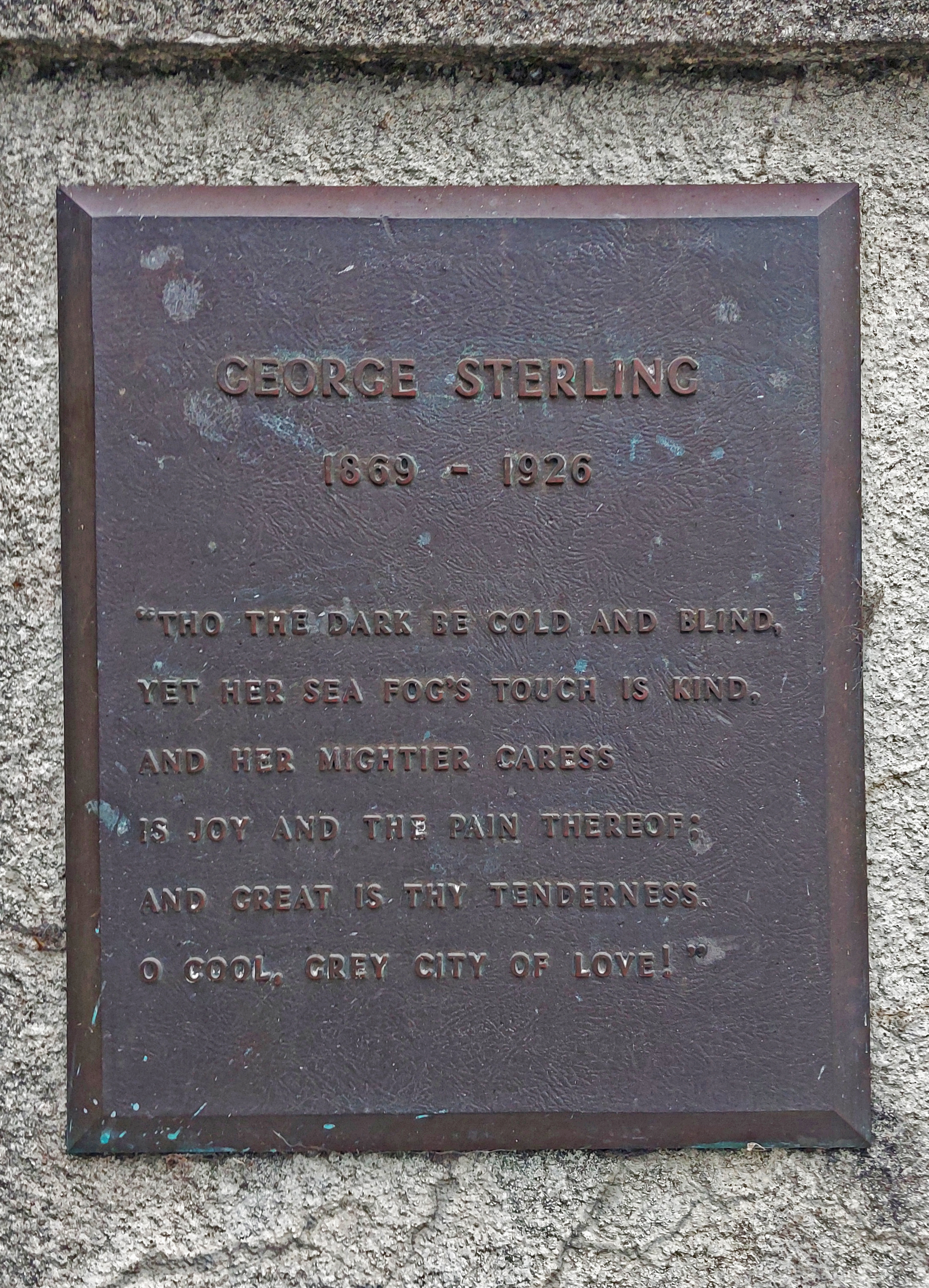
Plaque at entrance to George Sterling Park on Russian Hill in San Francisco, quoting part of Sterling's poem "The Cool, Grey City of Love: San Francisco".

=== George Sterling Park ===
George Sterling Park in San Francisco is bordered by Greenwich, Larkin, Hyde, and Lombard Streets atop Russian Hill. A stone bench there was dedicated to Sterling on June 25, 1928. The bench included a plaque with quotations from Sterling's "Ode to Shelley" and "Song of Friendship".

In the 1970s the plaque was stolen. On July 10, 1982, the missing plaque was replaced with a new one quoting Sterling's poem "The Cool, Grey City of Love" at a ceremony attended by literary historian Don Herron, columnist Herb Caen, science fiction author Ray Faraday Nelson, Jack London's daughter Becky, and poets Lawrence Ferlinghetti, Philip Lamantia, Donald Sidney-Fryer, and Nancy Peters.

The new plaque was later moved to its present location at the park's northwest corner.

=== George Sterling Bridge ===
A footbridge crossing a ravine in Carmel-by-the-Sea between Torres Street (location of Sterling's house) and Vizcaino Avenue was informally called "George Sterling Bridge". Sterling had used the bridge when he was a Carmel resident.

The home of composer David Alberto and his wife Iris "... faces the ravine, spanned midway by the George Sterling Bridge, on which face also the homes built by Herbert Heron, Fred Bechdolt, and George Sterling—later acquired by Jimmie Hopper." Some residents wanted the bridge formally named after Sterling, but in the late 1940s or early 1950s the bridge became dilapidated and was removed.

=== George Sterling redwood tree ===
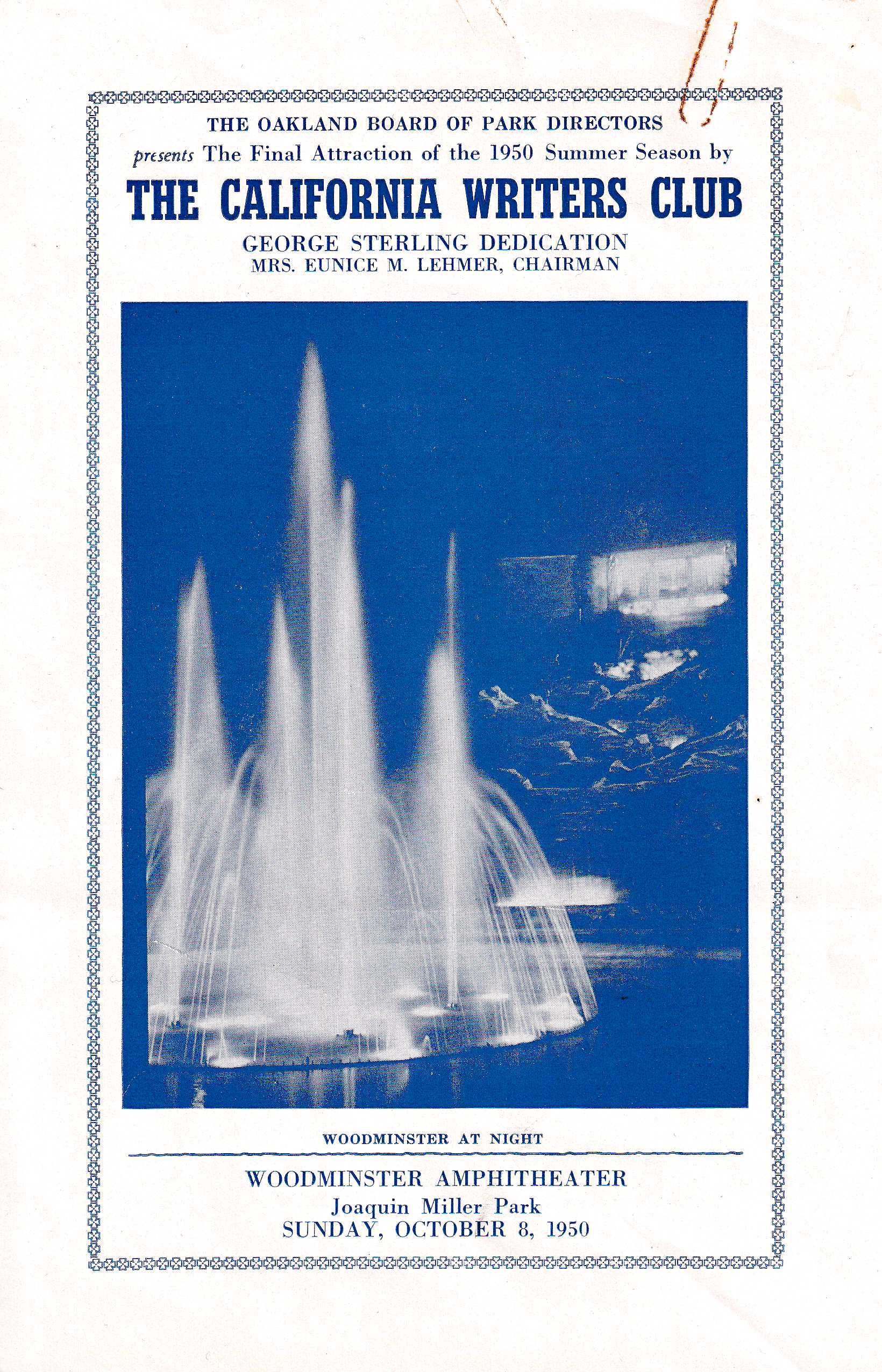
1950 Oct. 8: front cover of program for The California Writers Club George Sterling Dedication, Joaquin Miller Park.

On October 8, 1950, in Joaquin Miller Park in Oakland, the California Writers Club dedicated a redwood tree near the park's cascade as a memorial to Sterling. The park is the former estate of poet Joaquin Miller, a friend of Sterling's. Sterling and friends frequently camped in and near Miller's estate from 1891 to 1905, when Sterling lived in Oakland and Piedmont, California.

The dedication ceremonies included an introduction by Hal Johnson, president of the California Writers Club; reminiscences of Sterling by three people who knew him; readings of poems by Sterling; performances of three songs ("The Hidden Garden", "A Visitant", "Nightfall") with lyrics by Sterling; the placing of a memorial plaque; dance performances to five of Sterling's poems; and a performance of passages from The Redwoods, a Bohemian Club play by Sterling.

The Sterling redwood was next to a tree honoring his best friend Jack London. Both trees were in Writers Grove, with other redwood trees bearing plaques to writers. To a visitor standing near Joaquin Miller Road and looking uphill at the Cascade (a long series of stairways designed to resemble water cascading down a hill), Writers Grove is left of the Cascade, uphill from a playground. Today no plaques are visible on trees there.

== Roads ==
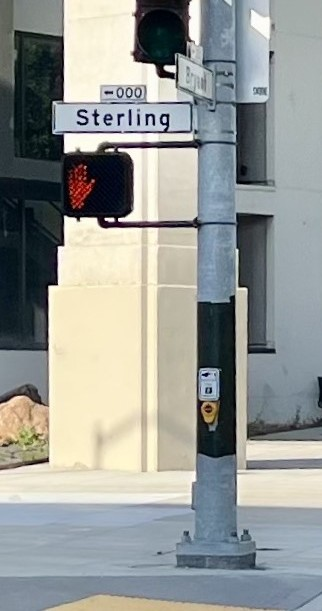
Signs for corner of Sterling Street and Bryant, San Francisco, September 2025. Photo by Vince Emery.

Sterling Street in San Francisco is named for George Sterling. The street now leads from Bryant Street to an onramp for carpools to drive onto the San Francisco–Oakland Bay Bridge to Oakland. When the Bay Bridge was first built in 1937, Sterling Street ran under the onramp to Harrison Street, passing the Sterling Street Substation which is now operated by PG&E. The substation was constructed by the Key System to provide electricity to the Bay Bridge. The Key System was a subsidiary of the Realty Syndicate. Sterling was one of seven founders of the Realty Syndicate and served on its board of directors for nine years.

- Sterling Avenue in Berkeley is named for George Sterling.
- Sterling Avenue in Alameda is named for George Sterling.
- Sterling Drive in Oakland is thought to be named for George Sterling.

== Poetry on monuments ==
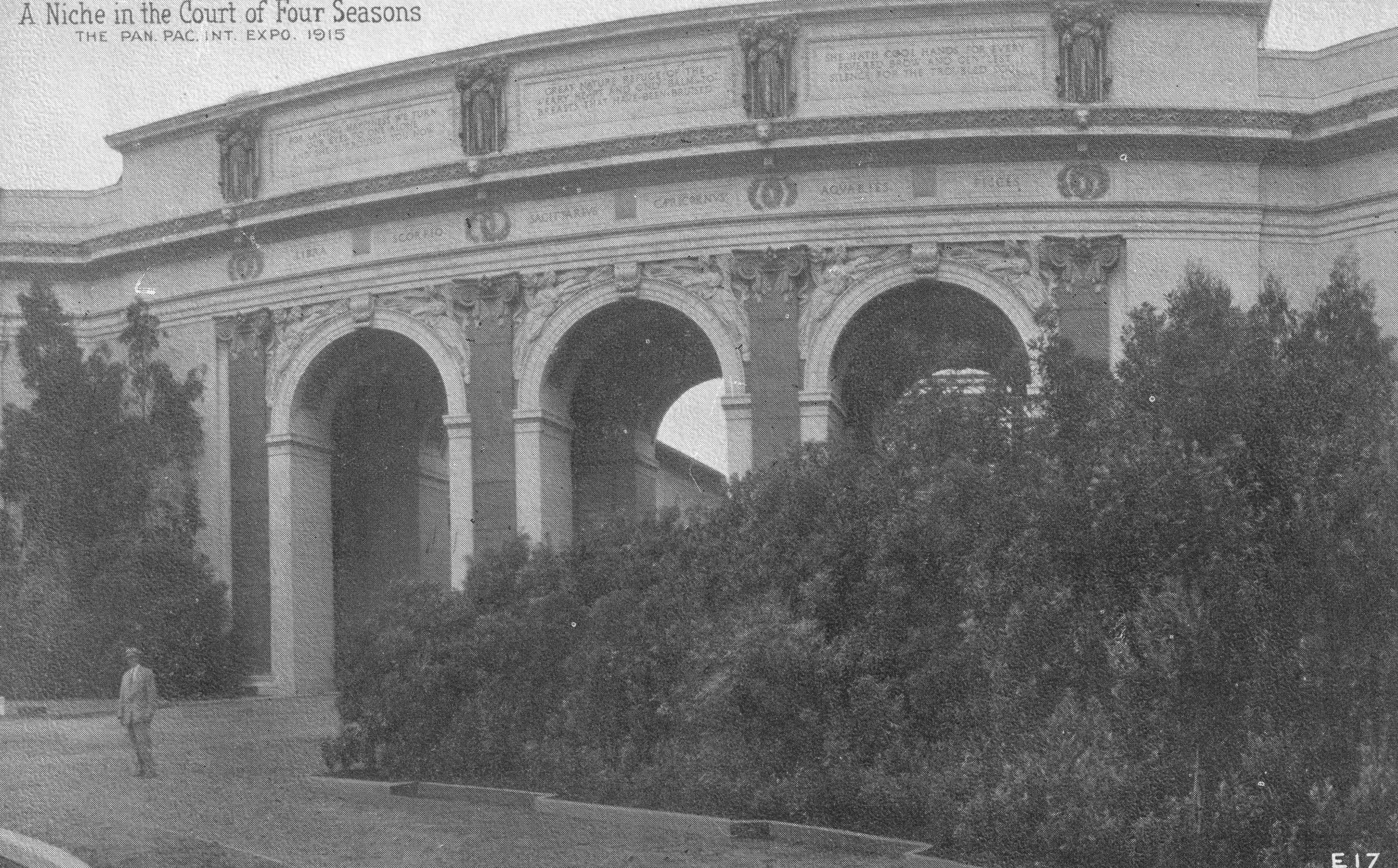
Postcard shows verses by George Sterling on 3 panels above 3 arches in the Court of the Four Seasons at the 1915 Panama-Pacific International Exposition world's fair in San Francisco.

- "Sans Dieu Rien": The tomb of the family of artist Charles Rollo Peters is in the San Carlos Cemetery (Monterey, California). A granite monument to the artist's wife, Kathleen Frances Murphy Peters (who died March 15, 1902 at age 32 after giving birth) and their daughter, Kathleen Mary Peters (born February 18, 1902, who on December 9, 1904 accidentally burned herself to death at age two) includes an epitaph poem to both of them with Sterling's signature engraved beneath. The monument is located in the northeast corner of the cemetery in the Saint Angela Peters Plot. It is not visible on Google Maps due to tree coverage, but is next to a wood fence behind which large construction machines are stored.
- The Triumph of Bohemia: In 1915, six lines from Sterling's 1907 play The Triumph of Bohemia were inscribed in three-foot-tall capital letters across three panels above three seven-story-tall arches forming the eastern wall of the Court of the Four Seasons in the Panama-Pacific International Exposition world's fair:
  FOR LASTING HAPPINESS WE TURN OUR EYES
  TO ONE ALONE, AND SHE SURROUNDS YOU NOW--
  GREAT NATURE, REFUGE OF THE WEARY HEART,
  AND ONLY BALM TO BREASTS THAT HAVE BEEN BRUISED!
  SHE HATH COOL HANDS FOR EVERY FEVERED BROW,
  AND GENTLEST SILENCE FOR THE TROUBLED SOUL.

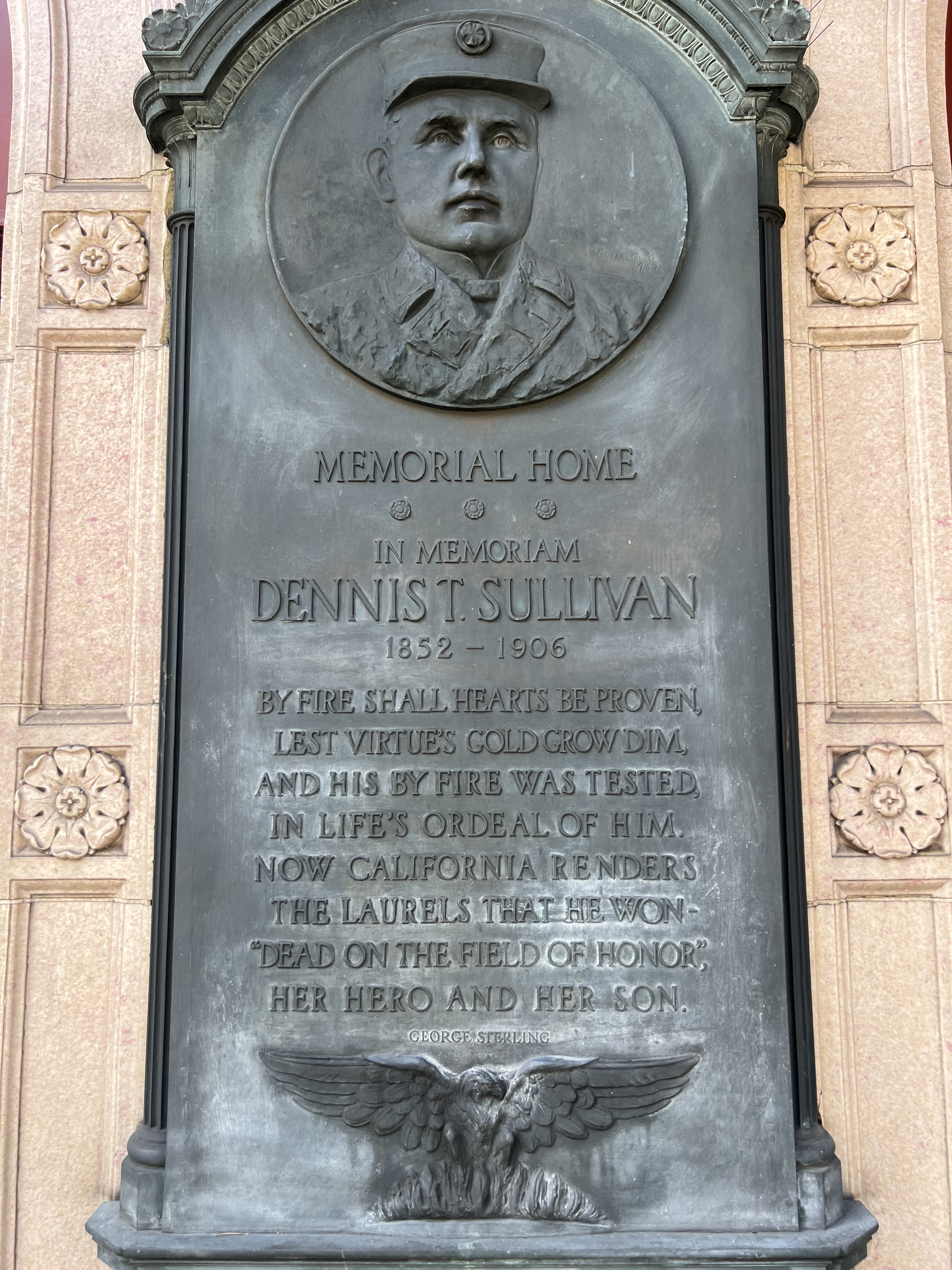
Dennis T. Sullivan memorial plaque sculpted by Melvin Earl Cummings with poem by George Sterling.

- "In Memoriam: Dennis T. Sullivan (1852–1906)": On March 16, 1922, a large bronze plaque sculpted by Melvin Earl Cummings was placed in front of the official residence for San Francisco's fire chief at 870 Bush Street in memory of Dennis T. Sullivan, San Francisco fire chief who was killed in the 1906 San Francisco Earthquake. The six-foot-tall plaque was paid with donations from firemen. The plaque includes a memorial poem by Sterling.
- "The City by The Sea: San Francisco": In the Beach Chalet in San Francisco's Golden Gate Park, the 1937 ground floor mural San Francisco Life by Lucien Labaudt includes a painted banner arched over a doorway with the quotation "At the end of our streets—the stars", from Sterling's poem "The City by The Sea: San Francisco", and Sterling's name and life dates "1869–1926".
- "Ballad of St. John of Nepomuk": In 1976, the handwritten manuscript of Sterling's poem "Ballad of St. John of Nepomuk" was framed and placed on permanent display in the Bohemian Club Library in San Francisco.

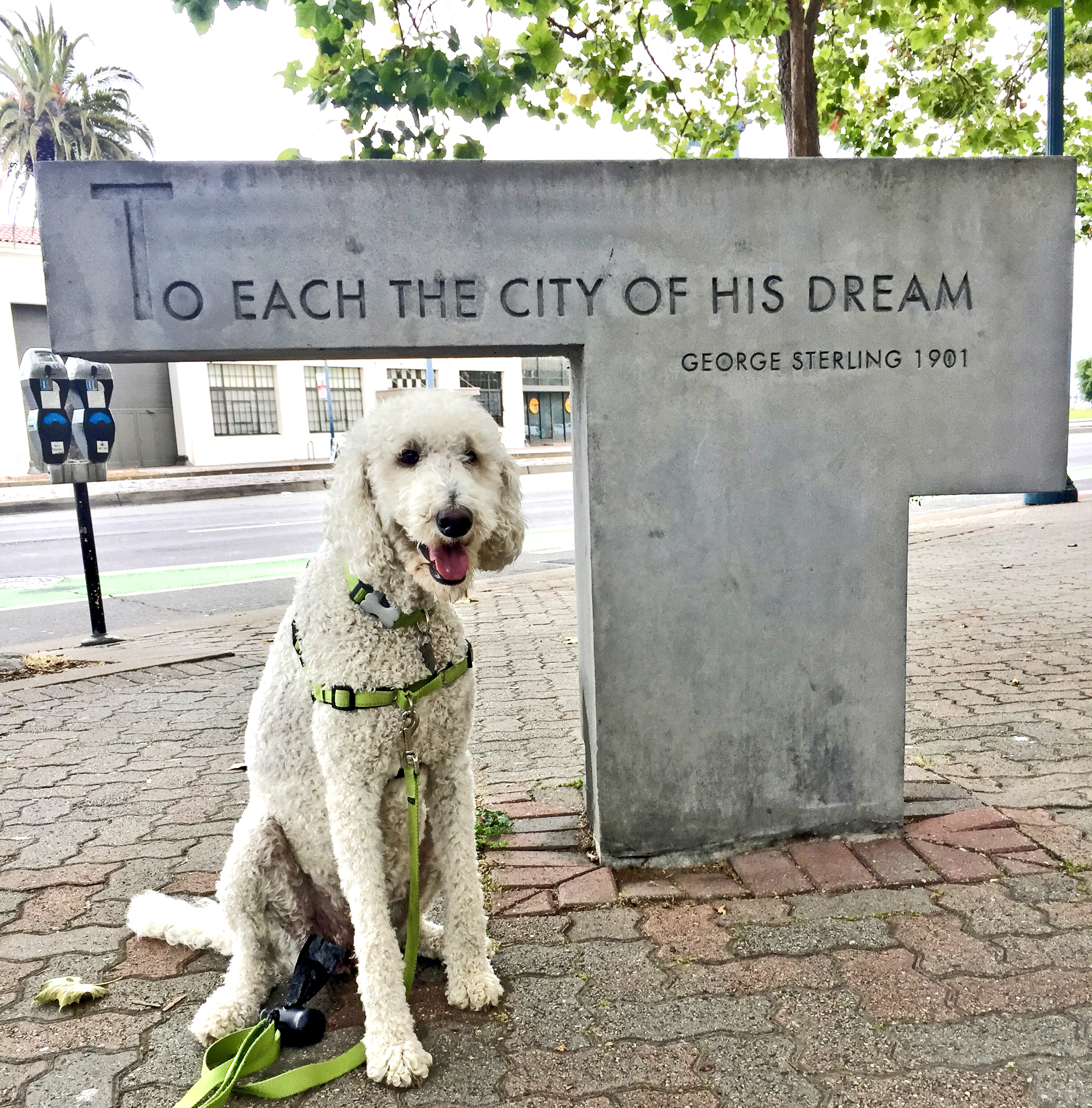
San Francisco monument quotes "Memorial Day," George Sterling's first major poem. Photo by Vince Emery.

- "Memorial Day": In San Francisco at the northeast corner of Townsend Street and Embarcadero the San Francisco Art Commission installed a stone monument with Sterling's name, the year 1901, and the quotation "To each the city of his dream", the first line of "Memorial Day", Sterling's first major poem.
- "Pumas": In 2002, artist Robert Alexander Baillie carved George Sterling's poem "Pumas" onto a large limestone monument in South Carolina's Brookgreen Gardens.
- "The Black Vulture": In October 2003, a plaque with Sterling's poem "The Black Vulture" was installed at 2080 Addison Street, Berkeley, California.

== Memorials in print ==
=== "Sterling" broadside by H. L. Mencken ===
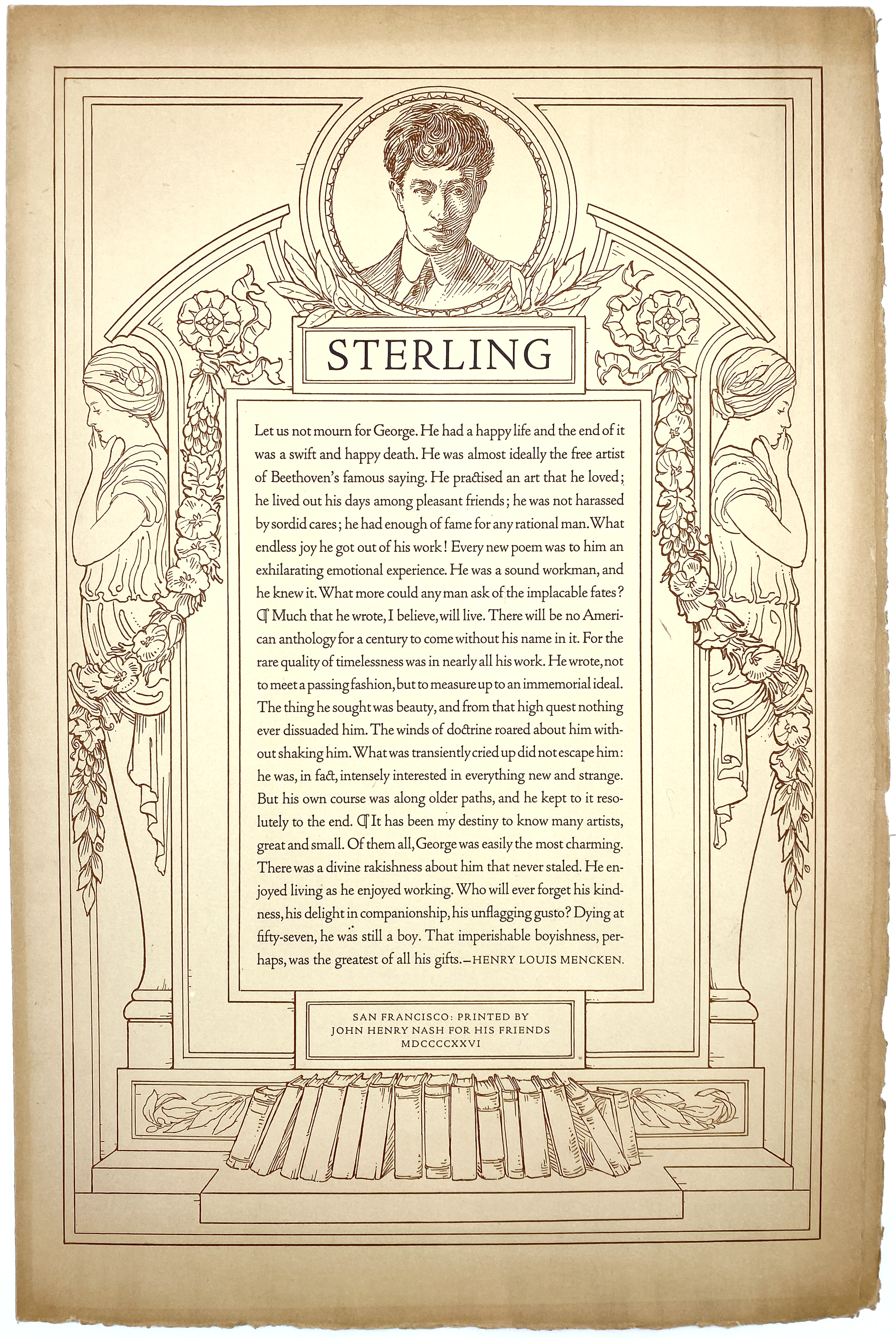
1926 broadside memorial to George Sterling with text by H. L. Mencken, art by William Hancock Wilke.

In 1926, fine printer and designer John Henry Nash designed and published a broadside memorial to Sterling. The poster-sized 12½-by-19-inch sheet features text by H. L. Mencken and art by William Hancock Wilke (1880–1958). The reverse includes text by Nash explaining why and how he came to create the memorial and "To Ray Coyle," a sonnet written by Sterling as a memorial to artist Ray Frederick Coyle (1885–1924). Nash published only 300 copies of the broadside.

=== Bohemian Club memorial card ===
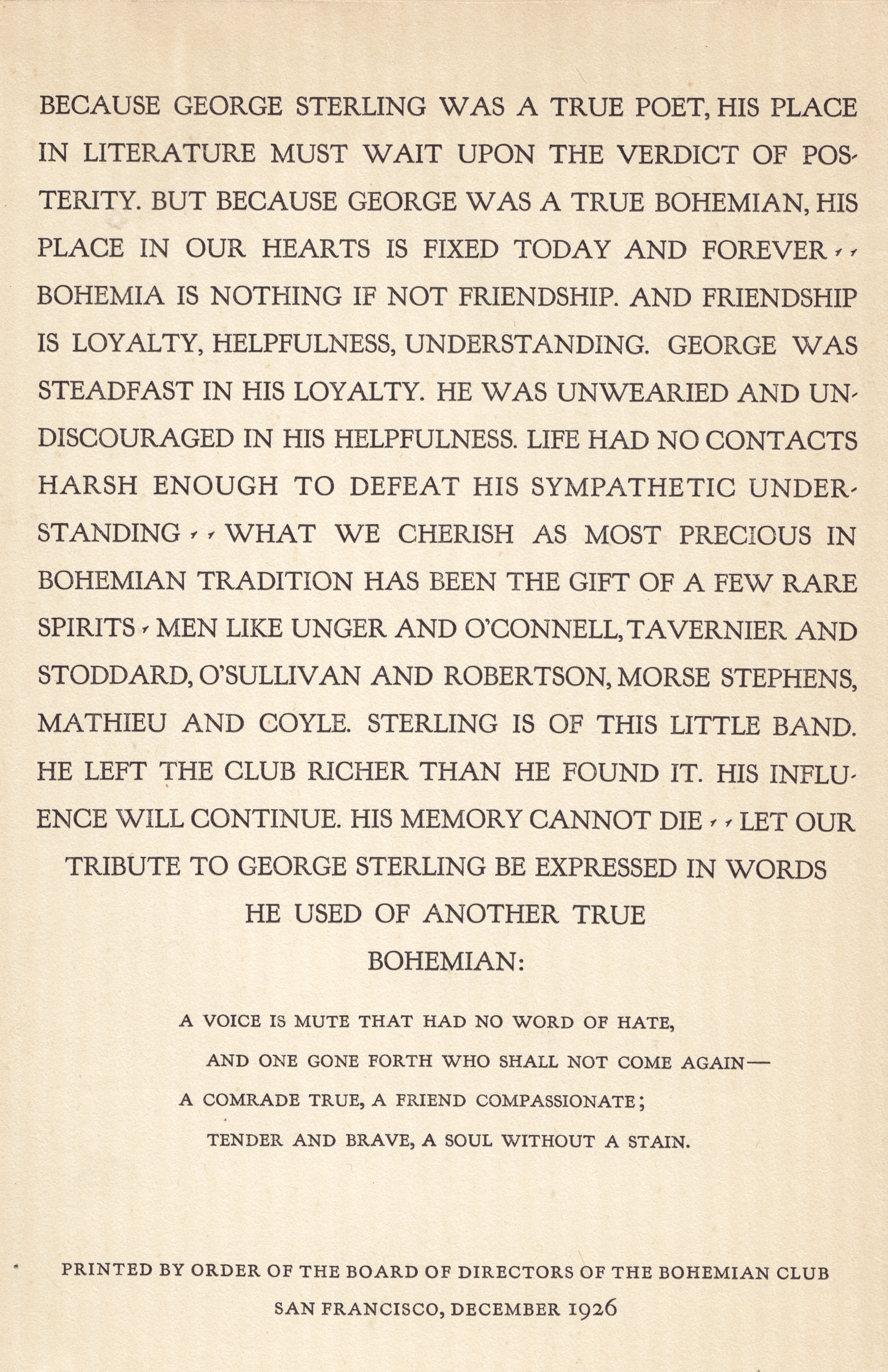
December 1926 memorial tribute card to poet and playwright George Sterling, published by the Bohemian Club, San Francisco, California.

In December 1926, the board of directors of the Bohemian Club issued a memorial card extolling fellow club member Sterling.

=== Poetry Society of America Centenary Memoir-Anthology ===
In 1969, in honor of the centennial of Sterling's 1869 birth, the Poetry Society of America published the book George Sterling: A Centenary Memoir-Anthology, edited by the Society's president Charles Anghoff. Anghoff also wrote a 14-page introduction (including a "Biographical Notes" section). The book presents 34 poems by Sterling, including "A Wine of Wizardry".

=== Memorial issues of magazines ===
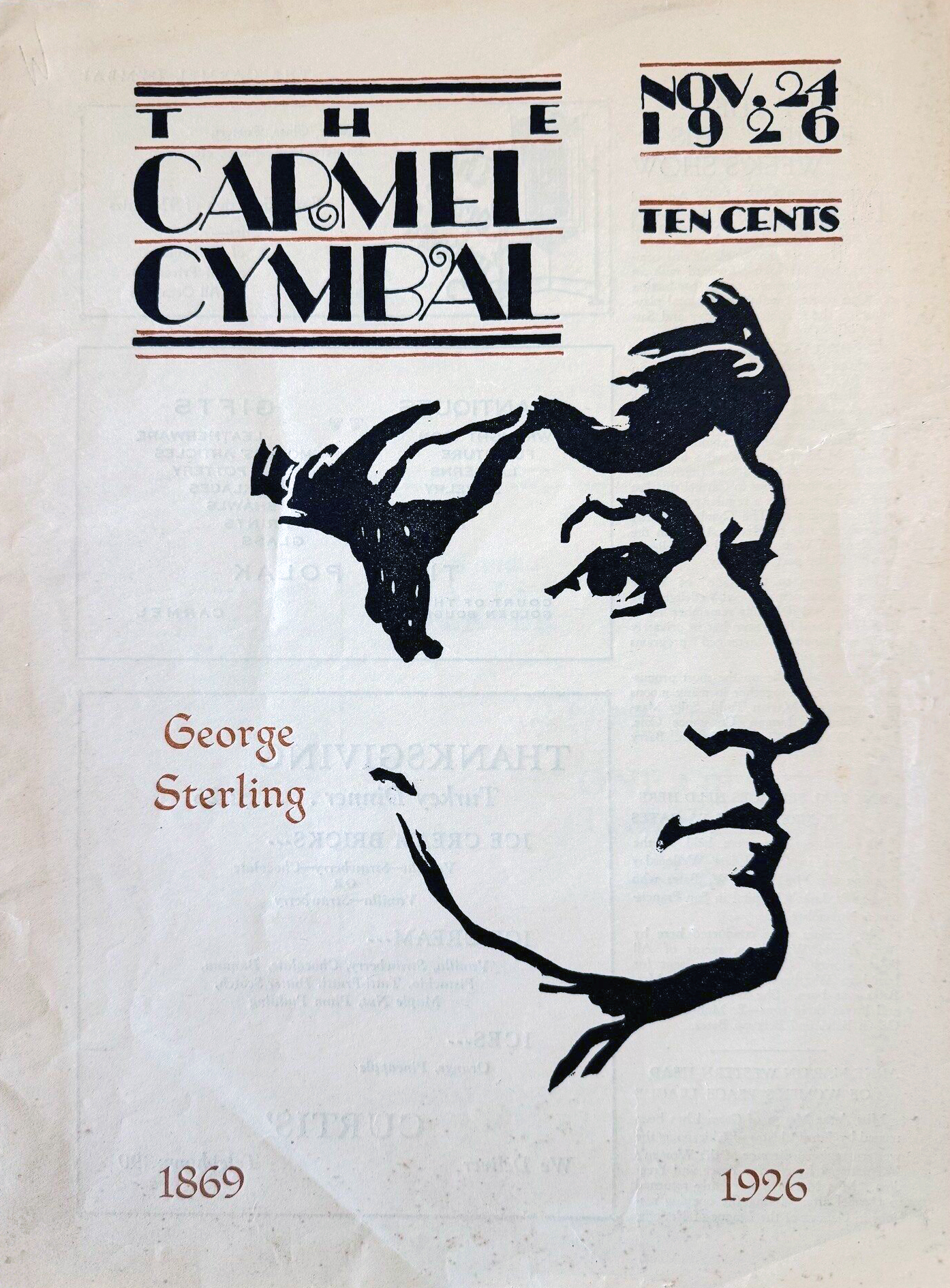
November 24, 1926 issue of Carmel Cymbal in memory of poet and playwright George Sterling.

* Carmel Cymbal v. 2, n. 21 (November 24, 1926): Articles on Sterling by Robinson Jeffers, Willard Kenneth Bassett, and Herbert Heron. An excerpt from Sterling's play Lilith.

- Overland Monthly v. 35, n. 3 (March 1927): 13 poems by Sterling ["The Grizzly Giant (Mariposa Grove)," "The Dweller in Darkness," "The Day," "To My Wife," "The Voice of the Wheat," "Wings," "Peace," "Safe," "Beauty and Truth," "To Margaret Anglin," "Late Tidings," untitled (first line: "High on Sonoma Mountain"), "In Autumn".]; 3 "Rhymes and Reactions" columns by Sterling; 14 pieces of nonfiction about Sterling by James Rorty, Charmian Kittredge London, and others; 10 poems about Sterling by Robinson Jeffers, Charles Warren Stoddard, and others.
- Overland Monthly v. 35, n. 11 (November 1927): 3 poems by Sterling ["Cool, Grey City of Love (San Francisco)," "The Sowers," "The Black Vulture"; 1 book review by Sterling; 12 pieces of nonfiction about Sterling by Mary Hunter Austin, Robinson Jeffers, and others; 10 poems about Sterling by Edwin Markham. Clark Ashton Smith, Witter Bynner, Ina Coolbrith, and others.
- Overland Monthly v. 35, n. 12 (December 1927): 6 poems by Sterling ["On Reading the Poems of Father Tabb," "To My Wife," "Spring in Carmel," "From the Shadows," "For G.S.," "To a Girl Dancing"]; 20 pieces of nonfiction about Sterling by James Rorty, Charmian Kittredge London, Upton Sinclair, H. L. Mencken, and others; 11 poems about Sterling by Edgar Lee Masters, Robinson Jeffers, and others.

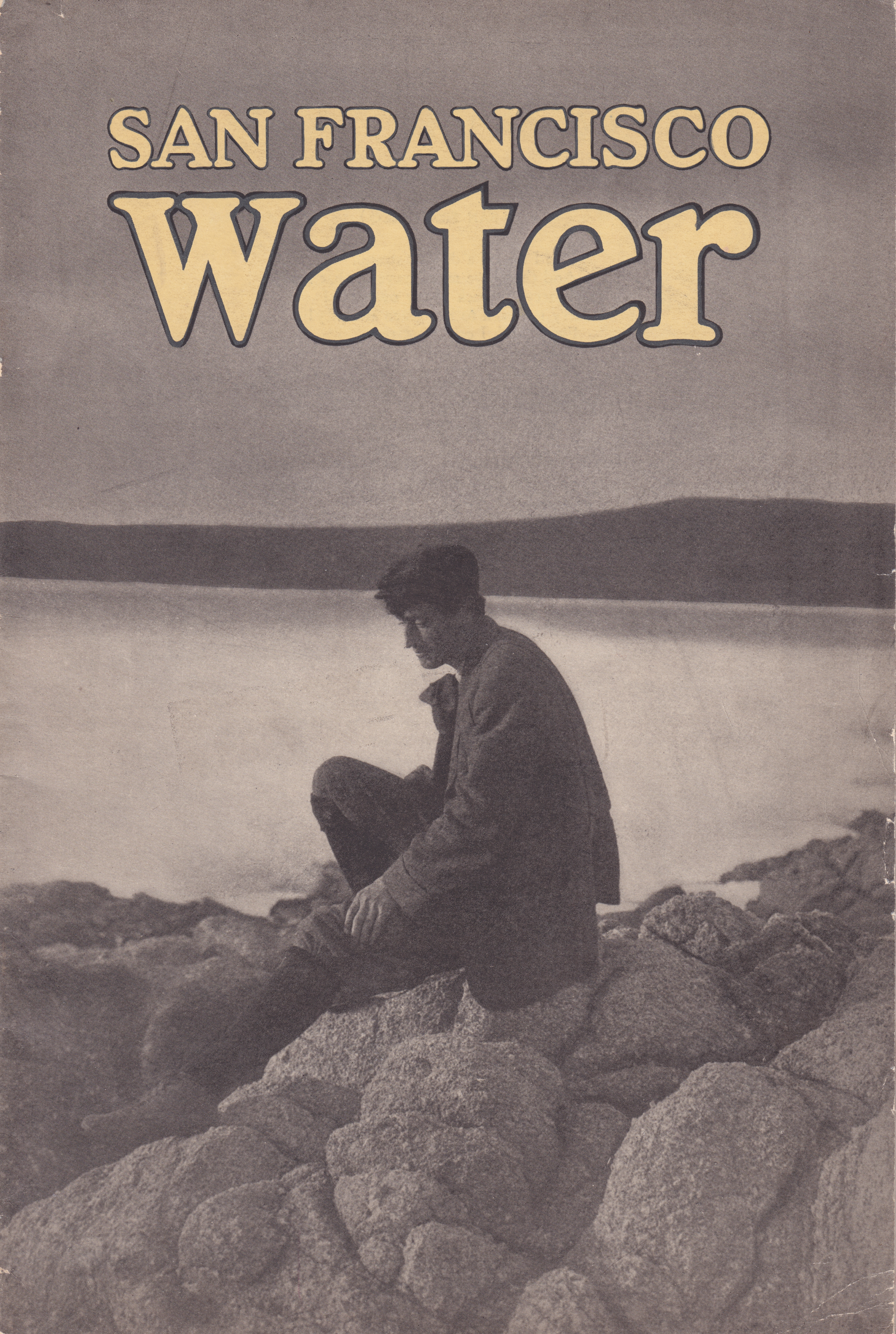
July 1928: George Sterling memorial issue of San Francisco Water magazine.

- San Francisco Water v. 7, n. 3 (July 1928): 9 poems by Sterling ("The Cool, Grey City of Love (San Francisco)," "Yerba Buena, July 9, 1846," "Song of Friendship" (Sterling wrote two poems with that title. This is believed to be the first publication of the one with the first line "Give, O Gods, a laughing lass"), "Beyond the Tides," "Homeward," "The Quest," "Reading the Poems of Father Tabb," "To Pain," "The Master-Mariner"; 5 pieces of nonfiction about Sterling by Idwal Jones, Willard Huntington Wright, and others.
- Letters of Western Authors n. 1 (January 1935): The Book Club of California published monthly keepsakes for its members. This issue provided an essay on Sterling by poet Robinson Jeffers (which concluded ". . . his work is individual as well as beautiful, you recognize the best of it instantly for his own and no other person's."), a reproduction of a November 24, 1914 letter from Sterling to Albert Bender (art patron), and a brief afterword by historian Oscar Lewis.
- Book Collecting v. 7 n. 12 (January 1938): Its editor called this issue his "special George Sterling issue". It included "'Sterling' in Golden Era: Who Is Sterling?" by William McDevitt, a letter to the editor about Sterling, "George Sterling's Appraisal of the Odes of Keats" by Sterling, and "George Sterling's Copy of Keats" by McDevitt.
- London Collector n. 5 (August 1974): The entire issue is devoted to Edwin B. Erbentraut's essay “Glowing Meteor, Deathless Light: Jack London and George Sterling” and 7 accompanying photos. It reprints the poems "Nightmare," "The Music of Memory," and "Dirge." It quotes several others.
- Bohemian Club Library Notes n. 36 (June 1976): "It seems fitting that this number of Library Notes should be devoted to George Sterling," wrote Library Notes editor David B. Magee, "for 1976 commemorates the fiftieth anniversary of his tragic death." The issue includes "Homage to Our Patron Saint: John of Nepomuk" by Warren R. Howell, which relates the history of John of Nepomuk, the Bohemian Club's adoption of the saint as its patron, why and how Sterling wrote his "Ballad of St. John of Nepomuk," his poem's publication history, and variations between its versions. "George Sterling, 1869-1926" by David B. Magee describes Sterling's history with the Bohemian Club (illustrated by title pages of The Triumph of Bohemia and Truth) and Haig Patigian's death mask of Sterling. A facsimile of Sterling's handwritten poem is laid in as a 6-page insert.
- Noticias del Puerto de Monterey: Bulletin of the Monterey History and Art Association v. 57 n. 1 (Fall/Winter 2008): The entire issue is "Deep-Sea Matrimony: George Sterling and 'The Abalone Song'" by Geoffrey Dunn (writer), covering the history of, lyrics to, and writers of Sterling's popular song, plus 17 photographs. The cover photo, showing Sterling nude seated on a beach in Carmel-by-the-Sea with an abalone shell at his feet, was taken by Jack London.
- Piedmont's History v. 16 (Fall/Winter 2015): Almost the entire issue of the Piedmont Historical Society's journal is devoted to "George Sterling" by Gail G. Lombardi, a history of Sterling's eight years in Piedmont, California (1898–1905) and many photographs.

=== Memorial poems ===
After Sterling's suicide, memorial poems to him by more than sixty poets appeared in newspapers, magazines, and books.

Writers ranged from well-known poets (Edgar Lee Masters, Edwin Markham, Witter Bynner) to unknowns. Some memorials were by writers Sterling had mentored or whose careers he had promoted: Robinson Jeffers, Clark Ashton Smith, Audrey Wurdemann, William Rose Benét, Herbert Heron, Margaret Cobb, Alice Sterling Gregory (Sterling's sister), Leslie Nelson Jennings, and others.

The most well-known Sterling memorial poem is Lost Harbor by Leslie Nelson Jennings. It has been reprinted, excerpted, and quoted hundreds of times in books, magazines, newspapers, and speeches, and on monuments and grave markers.

This list includes only postmortem memorial poems, not tribute verses written while Sterling was alive, such as Jack London's poem "George Sterling".

- Zoe Ackerman: "George Sterling". Oakland Tribune (November 22, 1926), p. 16.
- Mary Hunter Austin (2 poems):
  - "I Have Known Poets". Nation v. 126 n. 3266 (February 8, 1928), p. 156. This poem does not mention Sterling by name, but no one familiar with Austin's life can doubt that she includes him.
  - "Three at Carmel". Saturday Review of Literature v. 5 n. 10 (September 28, 1928), p. 165.
- William Rose Benét: The Dust Which Is God: A Novel in Verse (New York: Dodd, Mead, 1941), remembers Sterling as Starr Gorham, pp. 72-75.
- William A. Brewer, Jr.: "George Sterling: 1869 - 1926". San Francisco Chronicle (November 21, 1926), p. 42.
- Witter Bynner: "George Sterling". Overland Monthly v. 85 n. 11 (November 1927), p. 332.
- J. C.: "Beyond". Oakland Tribune (November 28, 1926), p. 4-B.
- Axton Clark: "For George Sterling (Obit Nov. 16, 1926)". Overland Monthly v. 85 n. 11 (November 1927), p. 339.
- D. L. Clark: "Sleeper: George Sterling--November 1926". [New York] Bookman v. 666 n. 3 (November 1927), p. 274.
- Margaret S. Cobb: "To George Sterling". Overland Monthly v. 85 n. 3 (March 1927), p. 82.
- Louise Lord Coleman: "The Joyous Giver". Overland Monthly v. 85 n. 11 (November 1927), p. 339.
- Bert Cooksley: "George Sterling". Sunset v. 58 n. 2 (February 1927), p. 22.
- Ina Coolbrith: "George Sterling". Overland Monthly v. 85 n. 11 (November 1927), p. 328.
- Robert Couchman: "George Sterling". Overland Monthly v. 85 n. 3 (March 1927), p. 82.
- Anne deLartigue Kennedy: "My Last Wish". Overland Monthly v. 85 n. 1 (January 1927), p. 18.
- Ashley Dioses: "Atop the Crystal Moon". Dioses, Diary of a Sorceress (New York: Hippocampus Press, 2017), pp. 28- 37.
- George Douglas: "To George Sterling". Overland Monthly v. 85 n. 12 (December 1927), pp. 371, 383-384.
- Miriam Allen deFord: "From One to Whom He Was Kind". Overland Monthly v. 85 n. 12 (December 1927), p. 365.
- Laura Bell Everett: "On Reading George Sterling's 'Ode to Shelley'". Overland Monthly v. 85 n. 3 (March 1927), p. 82.
- Arthur Davison Ficke: "Memory of George Sterling". Unknown Ohio newspaper (circa 1926 - 1930).
- W. T. Fitch: "Sterling". Overland Monthly v. 85 n. 3 (March 1927), p. 82.
- Hildegarde Flanner: "Cry Hark!". Overland Monthly v. 85 n. 12 (December 1927), p. 372.
- M. R. Fletcher: "Reply to Sterling's 'Swan Song'". Wilmington Every Evening (February 25, 1927), p. 6.
- Elvira Foote: "In Memoriam". Overland Monthly v. 85 n. 11 (November 1927), p. 338.
- Elsa Gidlow: "Drunkard of Life (In Memory of George Sterling)". Overland Monthly v. 85 n. 12 (December 1927), p. 372.
- Tom Goff (3 poems):
  - "California Bromantics". In "Agape, Aghast, A-Gasp" on Medusa's Kitchen (January 28, 2011).
  - "To George Sterling: Master Poet, Dean of the California Romantics". On Hippocampus Press website (April 22, 2013).
  - "Sinister Asteroids". In "California Romantics" on Medusa's Kitchen (March 31, 2017).
- Alice Sterling Gregory: "Amaranth". Overland Monthly v. 85 n. 12 (December 1927), p. 367.
- N. J. Herby: "George Sterling: In Memoriam". Oakland Tribune (November 21, 1926), p. 8-B.
- Herbert Heron: "To George Sterling (1907)". Overland Monthly v. 85 n. 12 (December 1927), p. 372.
- John Hervey: "George Sterling". All's Well v. 66 n. 11 (March 1927), front cover.
- Robinson Jeffers (2 poems):
  - "George Sterling". San Francisco Review v. 2 n. 4 (November-December 1926).
  - "Winter Sundown (In Memory of George Sterling)" [reprinted as "The Death of George Sterling"]. Overland Monthly v. 85 n. 3 (March 1927), p. 73.
- Leslie Nelson Jennings: (3 poems)
  - "Vale". Voices: An Open Forum for the Poets v. 6 n. 2–3 (December 1926 – January 1927), p. 63. (Reprinted as the second part of the sonnet sequence of "Lost Harbor: for George Sterling.")
  - "Lost Harbor: for George Sterling" (3 versions):
    - (single sonnet). New Republic v. 50 n. 643 (March 30, 1927), p. 13.
    - (sestet). Theodore Roscoe, ed., United States Submarine Operations in World War II (Annapolis: United States Naval Institute, 1949), p. 498.
    - (sonnet sequence). Footsteps of Departure (Iowa City: Prairie Press, 1963), pp. 38-39.
  - "Unfinished Sonnet: for George Sterling". Recurrence: A Quarterly of Rhyme v. 1, n. 1 (Summer 1950), p. 7.
- James Sydney Johnson: "Dirge for George Sterling". The Centaur, Everue and Other Poems (San Francisco: Windsor Press, 1927), . 32.
- Mary Q. Laughlin: "George Sterling". Buffalo Times (December 5, 1926), p. 566.
- Derrick Norman Lehmer: "The Soul of a Poet". Overland Monthly v. 85 n. 12 (December 1927), p. 372.
- Mary Sinton Leitch: "The Phantom Rose: To George Sterling". Lyric (May 1927).
- Battell Loomis: "Love Is Akin to Pity: To the Memory of My Befriender, George Sterling". Step Ladder: A Monthly Journal of Bookly Ascent v. 13 n. 3 (March 1927), p. 81.
- Helene Magaret: "To George Sterling". Step Ladder: A Monthly Journal of Bookly Ascent v. 13 n. 1 (January 1927), p. 16.
- Edwin Markham: "Sarpedon: In Memory of George Sterling". Overland Monthly v. 85 n. 11 (November 1927), pp. 325-327.
- Lannie Haynes Martin: "To George Sterling". Overland Monthly v. 85 n. 3 (March 1927), p. 79.
- Edgar Lee Masters (2 poems):
  - "Golden Gate Park (For George Sterling)". Overland Monthly v. 85 n. 12 (December 1927), p. 365.
  - "Planting Trees at Tor House". The Harmony of Deeper Music: Posthumous Poems of Edgar Lee Masters (Austin: University of Texas Humanities Research Center, 1976), p. 60.
- Joyce Mayhew: "George Sterling". Overland Monthly v. 85 n. 12 (December 1927), p. 377.
- William McDevitt: "In Memorium [sic] George Sterling". Californiana n. 8 (February 1928), p. 3.
- Aline Michaelis: "The Years". Overland Monthly v. 85 n. 1 (January 1927), p. 7.
- Whitney Montgomery: "Genius". Overland Monthly v. 85 n. 5 (May 1927), p. 146.
- J. D. P.: "The Poet". Overland Monthly v. 85 n. 3 (March 1927), p. 82.
- Lori Petri: "Ashes". Overland Monthly v. 85 n. 8 (August 1927), p. 242.
- Madefrey Odhner: "Tancred". San Franciscan v. 2 n. 1 (March 1928), p. 16.
- Mrs. Fremont Older (Cora Baggerly Older): "Dawn". A Day in the Hills, Henry Meade Bland, editor. (San Francisco: privately printed, 1926), p. 62.
- James D. Phelan, "The Poet". A Day in the Hills, Henry Meade Bland, editor. (San Francisco: privately printed, 1926), p. 57.
- Harry Noyes Pratt: "George Sterling". Oakland Tribune (November 20, 1926), p. 14.
- Idella Purnell: "Good Fellow (George Sterling)". Overland Monthly v. 85 n. 11 (November 1927), p. 338.
- William Nauns Ricks: "Vale--George Sterling". Oakland Tribune (November 22, 1926), p. 16.
- Alva Romanes: "In Memoriam: To George Sterling". San Francisco Examiner (November 13, 1927), City Life section, p. 9.
- Herbert Selig: "For George Sterling". Overland Monthly v. 85 n. 3 (March 1927), p. 83.
- Donald Sidney-Fryer: "The House of Roses". Songs and Sonnets Atlantean (Sauk City: Arkham House, 1971), p. 105. See also a note on the poem, p. 164. Reprinted in Not Quite Atlantis: A Selection of Poems (Hornsea, England: StanZa Press, 2010), p. 20.
- Clark Ashton Smith (5 memorial poems):
  - "A Valediction to George Sterling". Overland Monthly v. 85 n. 11 (November 1927), p. 338.
  - "To George Sterling" (first line "Deep are the chasmal years and lustrums long"). To George Sterling: Five Poems (Glendale, California: Roy A. Squires, 1970).
  - "To George Sterling" (first line "His song shall waken the dull-sleeping throng"). To George Sterling: Five Poems (Glendale, California: Roy A. Squires, 1970).
  - "L'Espoir du Néant: À George Sterling". Selected Poems (Sauk City: Arkham House, 1971).
  - "To George Sterling" (first line "O Beauty, goddess known and sung of old"). The Complete Poetry and Translations of Clark Ashton Smith, S. T. Joshi and David E. Schultz, eds. (New York: Hippocampus Press, 2012), v. 1.
- Rex Smith: "Who Long Walked Here with Beauty". Overland Monthly v. 85 n. 11 (November 1927), p. 339.
- Rupert Tourney: "George Sterling". The Bookfellows Anthology (Chicago: Bookfellows, 1927), p. 209.
- Dorothy Tyrrel (2 poems):
  - "George Sterling". Overland Monthly v. 85 n. 3 (March 1927), p. 82.
  - "In Memory of George Sterling: Died Nov. 17, 1926". Oakland Tribune (November 17, 1934), p. 22.
- Anne Arrington Tyson: "Love Watches, Will Not Sleep: To George Sterling". Magdalen and Other Poems (New York: Knickerbocker Press, 1930), p. 45.
- Marvin Viale: "In Memory of George Sterling". San Francisco Bulletin (July 27, 1929), p. 13.
- Donald Wandrei: "In Memoriam: George Sterling". Ecstasy and Other Poems (Athol, Massachusetts: W. Paul Cook, 1928), p. 266.
- Amy B. Warburton: "A Hymn to the Stars: To the Memory of George Sterling". Oakland Tribune (November 23, 1926), p. 20.
- Howard Wolf: "For George Sterling". Akron Beacon Journal (November 21, 1930), p. 4.
- Charles Erskine Scott Wood: "For George Sterling at Our House on Telegraph Hill". Overland Monthly v. 85 n. 12 (December 1927), p. 364.
- Audrey Wurdemann (2 memorial poems):
  - "Chanson for George Sterling". The House of Silk (New York: Harold Vinal, 1927), p. 10.
  - "The Poet". The House of Silk (New York: Harold Vinal, 1927), p. 77.

== George Sterling Memorial Prize ==
George Sterling Memorial Prize: After Sterling's death, the Order of Bookfellows instituted the annual George Sterling Memorial Prize for the best poem of the year that appeared in the Bookfellows' journal Step Ladder.

== Grave ==
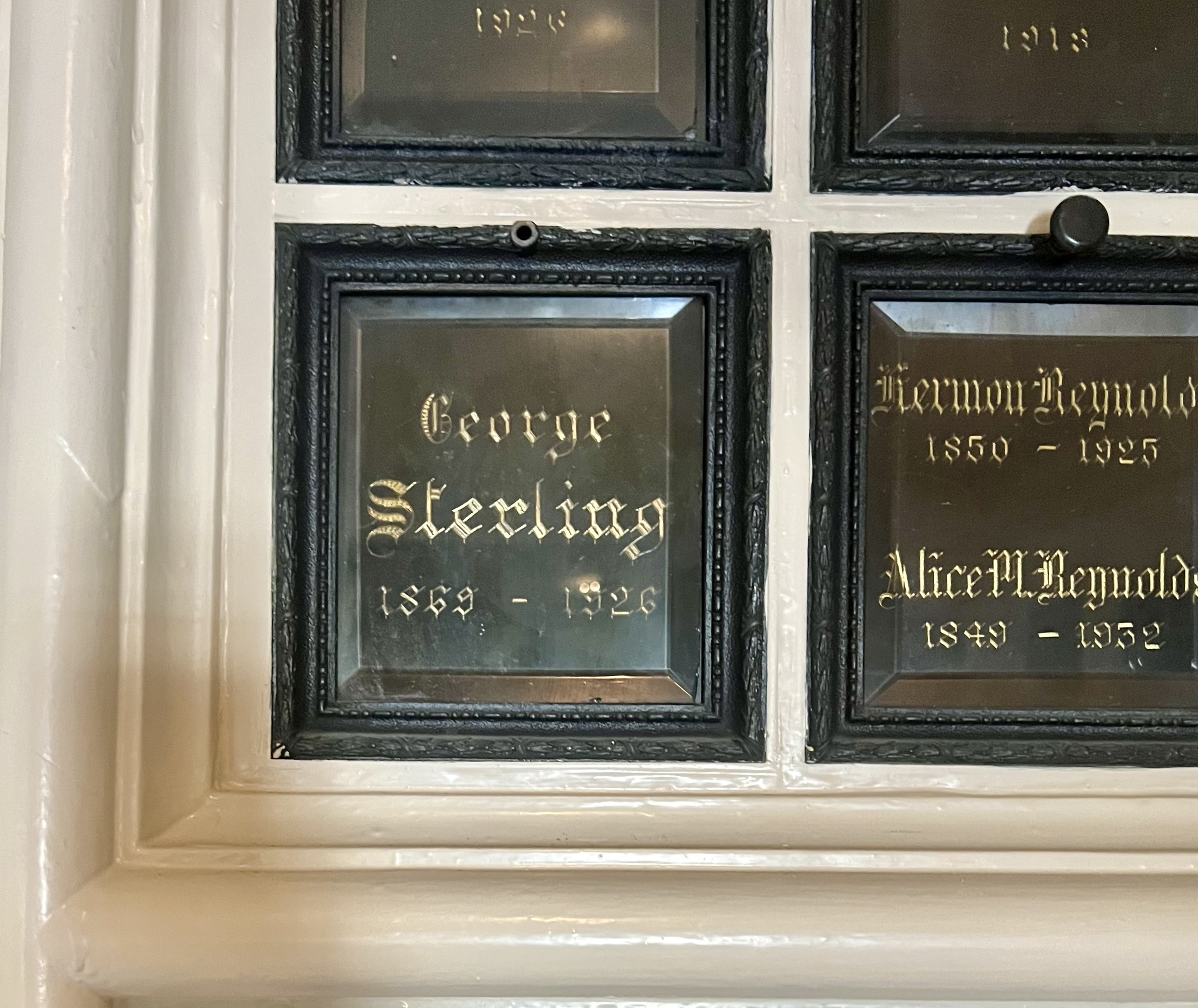
Niche holding the ashes of poet and playwright George Sterling, Cypress Room, Chapel of Memories Columbarium, Oakland, California. Photo by Vince Emery.

Sterling's ashes in a niche can be visited at the Chapel of Memories Columbarium, 4401 Howe Street, Oakland, California. His little niche (the size of a small post office box) is on the second floor of the rotunda dome in the Cypress Room, location B-5-1C, near the ceiling.

For assistance in finding Sterling's niche, ask in the office to the right of the building's main entrance.
