= Lost Harbor =

3 versions of poem by Leslie Nelson Jennings

- (for George Sterling)
- by Leslie Nelson Jennings
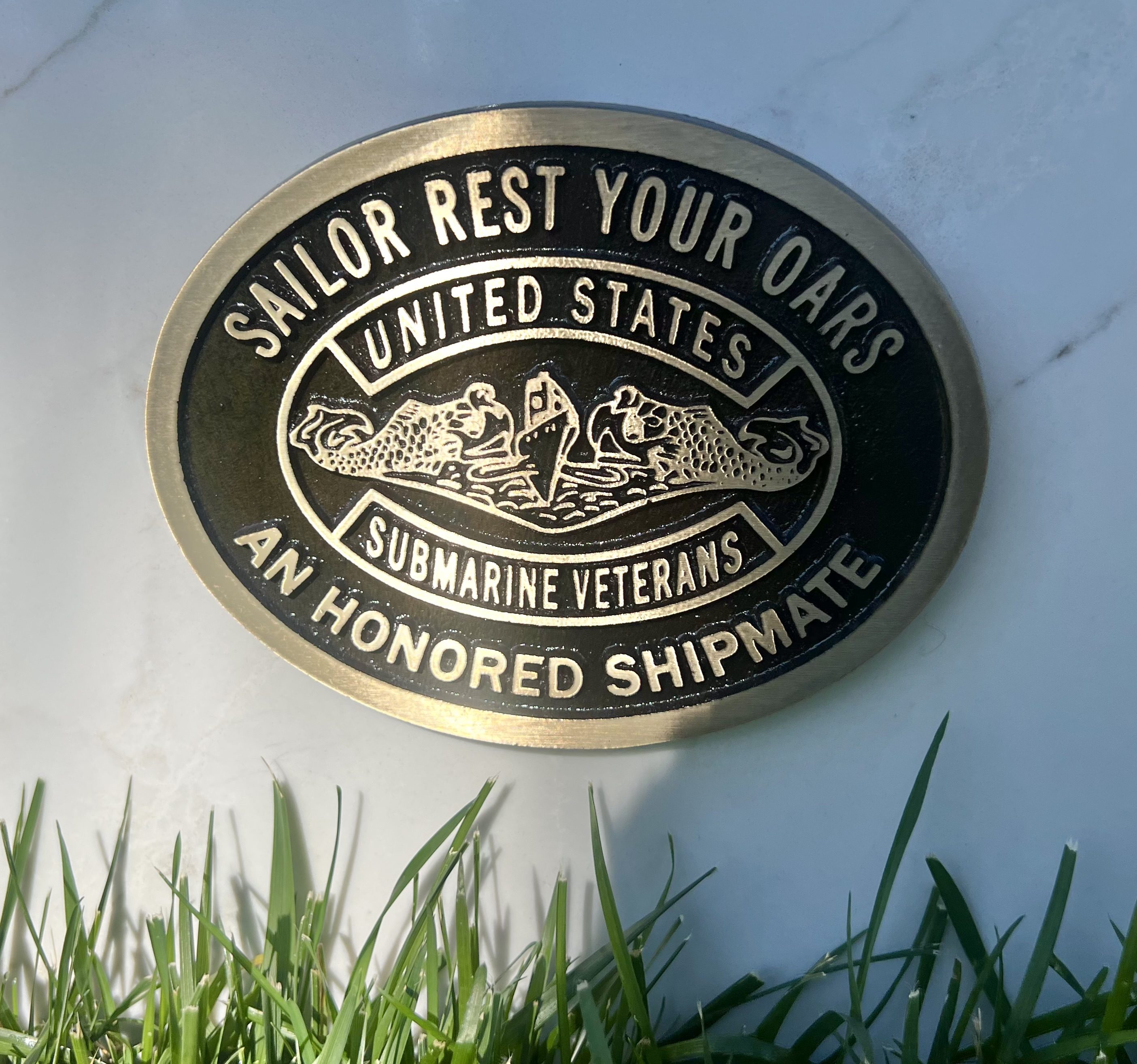
- "Sailor, rest your oars" from Leslie Nelson Jennings' poem "Lost Harbor" on grave marker with logo of United States Submarine Veterans, Inc..
- Written: 1926, 1927, and 1962 or 1963
- First published in: 1927 (sonnet), 1949 (sestet), 1963 (sonnet sequence)
- Cover artist: Carroll Coleman
- Country: United States
- Language: English
- Genre(s): elegy, obituary poetry
- Form: sonnet, sestet, sonnet sequence

"Lost Harbor" (sometimes known as "Sailor, Rest Your Oar") refers to three versions of a poem by American poet Leslie Nelson Jennings: a sonnet first published in 1927, a sestet published in 1949, and a sonnet sequence published in 1963. The six-line sestet version has been recited hundreds of times in memorial ceremonies and funerals for sailors, especially submariners. The best-known sentence of "Lost Harbor" is "Sailor, rest your oar." (It is often pluralized as "Sailor, rest your oars.") That sentence has been quoted many times in printed obituaries, in spoken eulogies, on monuments, and on tombstones for sailors. Author Jennings considered himself "a protégé of poet George Sterling," who was acclaimed for poetry about the sea and sailors. Jennings wrote "Lost Harbor" as a memorial for his mentor Sterling.

== The writer of the poems ==
American poet Leslie Nelson Jennings (1890–1972) was called by critic Stephen Philips "perhaps the most versatile and splendid maker of sonnets America has produced." Henry Hazlitt wrote: "His work combines remarkable technical skill with depth and sincerity of feeling." August Derleth said: "He is a sensitive, sure craftsman, whose work is in the best tradition of English poetry."

Jennings was born in Ware, Massachusetts September 6, 1890. When he was five, his family moved to San Francisco. He grew up there, worked on newspapers, and met poet George Sterling. Under the poet's guidance, Jennings learned to write poems. In 1915, illness forced Jennings to quit journalism and move to the sleepy village of Rutherford, California in rural Napa Valley. Jennings corresponded with Sterling, who helped Jennings sell poems, first to California magazines, then in 1916 to national publications. Jennings' early poems appeared in Poetry, New Republic, the Los Angeles Times, the Boston Globe, and the prestigious Scribner's. Dozens of newspapers reprinted his early poems.

In 1921, Jennings moved to New York City. He worked as a magazine editor while continuing to write poetry. He sold poems to the Saturday Evening Post, the New York Times, Nation, and the Saturday Review of Literature. 62 of his poems appeared in the New Yorker. Two books of his poems were published: Mill Talk & Other Poems and Footsteps of Departure. Jennings died March 27, 1972, in St. Petersburg, Florida.

== Creation of the poems ==
The story of the three versions of Jennings' "Lost Harbor" begins with Jennings' feelings after his mentor George Sterling committed suicide on November 17, 1926.

=== First version: 1927 sonnet ===
After Sterling's death, Jennings wrote "Lost Harbor," a memorial sonnet to Sterling. Jennings used the rhyme scheme of a Shakespearean sonnet. It consisted of two parts, a first eight-line section expressing one idea, followed by a six-line section making a related but different observation.

==== Synopsis ====
Jennings' first section imagines from Sterling's point of view why Sterling killed himself. Jennings addresses the reader and opens with a sailor's "love of life." Many people who knew Sterling had commented on the poet's remarkable enthusiasm for living. Jennings then gives a nautical analogy. He tells how the sailor's love of the ups and downs of life required a responsive helm——the control that steers his ship——but when his body sprang leaks and his mind mutinied against him, the sailor sought a peaceful harbor.

The beginning of the poem's second section is not clear if Jennings' first four lines speak to the reader or to the sailor. The second section first describes a "port of no return" with ships at anchor, then quietly departing in the night, leaving only an eddy in the water. Seagulls often follow departing ships; Jennings tells the gulls to stop. Jennings addresses the sailor, assuring him that he can stop rowing and that "No tangled wreckage" will be found.

==== Text of sonnet ====
Lost Harbor
(for George Sterling)

The love of life that captained him could brook
No laggard helm adversive to the gale;
He knew the fleetness of the wind, the look
Of decks aslant under a cloud of sail.
So, when the sea came sucking at the seams,
And mutiny like some dark plague began
Muttering through the turmoil of his dreams,
He sought a harbor where the slow tides ran.

There is a port of no return, where ships
May ride at anchor for a little space.
And then, some starless night, the cable slips,
Leaving an eddy at the mooring place...
Gulls, veer no longer. Sailor, rest your oar.
No tangled wreckage will be washed ashore.

==== First publications ====
Jennings sold his "Lost Harbor" sonnet to New Republic (which at that time, according to British poet and critic Leonard A. G. Strong, editor of The Best Poems of 1927, "keeps the highest standard in verse" of any general interest magazine in the United States or Britain). "Lost Harbor" appeared in the March 30, 1927 issue. Four newspapers reprinted the sonnet. In November, The Third Book of Modern Verse reprinted "Lost Harbor." After those reprints, the poem was largely unnoticed until after World War II, as explained below.

=== Second version: 1949 sestet ===
During World War II, at the behest of President Franklin Delano Roosevelt the United States military documented its own administrative and operational events for use in producing detailed, definitive histories to be completed after the war. As the United States Navy's contribution, teams of officers produced a 300-volume series titled United States Naval Administrative Histories of World War II, so detailed it was declared "Top Secret" and not published. The series included a two-volume history finished in 1946, Submarine Commands, edited by USN Captain Richard George Voge.

Next the United States Naval Institute commissioned writer Theodore Roscoe to delete secret information and technical descriptions from Submarine Commands and produce for general readers an authoritative history of United States submarine warfare in World War II. In his book, United States Submarine Operations in World War II, Roscoe included a section titled "United States Submarine Losses in World War II." After a list of the 52 lost submarines, Roscoe placed the last six lines of the "Lost Harbor" sonnet from The Third Book of Modern Verse. Roscoe did not tell his readers that this excerpt was only a portion of "Lost Harbor" and not Jennings' entire poem.

==== Text of sestet ====
Lost Harbor
by Leslie Nelson Jennings
shortened by Theodore Roscoe

There is a port of no return, where ships
May ride at anchor for a little space.
And then, some starless night, the cable slips,
Leaving an eddy at the mooring place...
Gulls, veer no longer. Sailor, rest your oar.
No tangled wreckage will be washed ashore.

=== Third version: 1963 sonnet sequence ===
Jennings had written another sonnet in memory of George Sterling, titled "Vale". He wrote it in late 1926, immediately after Sterling's suicide. He sent the poem to Harold Vinal, the editor and publisher of the magazine Voices: A Forum for the Poet. Vinal rushed "Vale" into print on the first page of the next issue of Voices.

In the early 1960s, Jennings returned to "Vale." He decided to combine it with "Lost Harbor" into a sonnet sequence. Jennings put his 1927 sonnet "Lost Harbor" first, and appended his earlier "Vale" after "Lost Harbor", deleting the title "Vale."

The result was a brief sonnet sequence (only two sonnets long), titled "Lost Harbor" with the subtitle "(for George Sterling)." Jennings placed the sonnet sequence in his 1963 book, Footsteps of Departure.

== Popularity with navies and sailors ==
The United States Naval Institute published Theodore Roscoe's United States Submarine Operations in World War II in December 1949. The book generated enthusiastic reviews and sold quickly. A second printing was rushed out the next month, then a third in March 1950. Submarine Operations became a required textbook for submarine trainees, and the book kept selling. By December 1965 it had gone through eight printings, exposing thousands of readers to Roscoe's six-line version of "Lost Harbor"

Paperback publisher Bantam Books hired Roscoe to condense Submarine Operations to fit into a small mass-market paperback, Pig Boats: The True Story of the Fighting Submarines of World War II. Pig Boats also featured Roscoe's "Submarine Losses" section, including the six-line version of "Lost Harbor." The book was published in December 1958, reprinted the next month, and sold steadily for more than two decades, going into its eighth printing in September 1982.

Jennings' sentence "Sailor, rest your oar" was quoted outside of his "Lost Harbor" poem as early as 1963, when a reader-written letter in the Akron Beacon Journal about the sinking of the submarine the USS Thresher, ended: "The men of the USS Thresher have joined their 1,500 shipmates of World War II in an effort to keep America free. '...Sailor, rest your oar.' "

Other writers quoted longer excerpts from "Lost Harbor." Historian and USMC Colonel R. D. Heinl Jr. wrote about the battleship USS New Jersey, ending his story by quoting Roscoe's six-line version of "Lost Harbor," not mentioning the poem's title nor its author. Heinl's article with the poem was syndicated by the North American Newspaper Alliance and reprinted in other publications. Three years later, a letter in the Everett [Washington] Daily Herald mourning the death of British around-the-world sailor Sir Francis Chichester quoted four lines.

Jennings' "Sailor, rest your oar" was quoted in published obituaries as early as 1973, in a Melbourne newspaper obituary for Australian sailor Chris Williams. The "Sailor, rest your oar" sentence appeared in a United States obituary as early as 1980, in a newspaper obituary written by Robert Simms, chaplain of the Delmarva, Maryland chapter of U.S. Veterans of World War II, for sailor Lawrence H. Lauer Jr.

Popularity of "Lost Harbor" increased partially because the United States Submarine Veterans, Inc. (commonly abbreviated as "USSVI") frequently used the poem. In April 1976, the six-line version of "Lost Harbor" was printed in National Submarine Review (the national magazine of the United States Submarine Veterans, Inc.) for the first time. The magazine subsequently reprinted the six-line "Lost Harbor" several times alongside its reports of the deaths of U.S. Submarine Service officers and sailors. In July 1991, U.S. Submarine Veterans, Inc. relaunched National Submarine Review as the glossy quarterly American Submariner. In many issues, the new magazine reprinted (and still does reprint) "Lost Harbor" in its "Eternal Patrol" section reporting on deceased submariners. In addition to the national magazine, regional newsletters published by local chapters of United States Submarine Veterans, Inc. also reprinted the six-line "Lost Harbor" (with or without author Jennings' name) on pages reporting the deaths of local members. The printed program for the 2024 memorial service of deceased sailor Robert J. Bissonnette reprinted the six-line "Lost Harbor".

Jennings' six-line "Lost Harbor" has often been reproduced with sailors' obituaries and memorials, epecially online, in recent years. In 2003, a fellow sailor included the poem on the website PigBoats.com to commemorate deceased sailor Guy Covert. In 2006, the poem appeared with remembrances of sailor John Krawczyk on SubmarineSailor.com. Found and Sons Funeral Chapel's website added the poem to an obituary for former sailor Wallace Edgar Peterson in 2014. The blog Playing Fair and Being Kind included the sestet in 2019 reminiscences of late sailor and friend Jack Harden. In 2020, "Lost Harbor" appeared as part of Acadia Burial and Cremation Direct's memorial for deceased sailor Harold R. Beal. In 2022, a discussion chat forum for veterans of U.S.S. LST 325 posted a memorial for deceased sailors Stanley Barish and Dominick Perruso. Their double obituary ended with the six-line poem. "Sailor, Rest Your Oar--A Testament to the Strong Bond Submariners Have," a July 12, 2024 Facebook post by Bill O'Connor, began with "Lost Harbor" and followed with a remembrance of submariner Marvin Koch. An online memorial wall for sailors of the submarine USS Mariano G. Vallejo begins with the six-line "Lost Harbor," but does not name the poem's title nor its author.

== Recitations at events ==
Every year speakers (often Navy veterans) recite the 6-line "Lost Harbor" at meetings of submariners and other sailors, at annual ceremonies commemorating them, and at funerals.

- Speakers at national and local submarine veterans' meetings have included the six-line "Lost Harbor" as part of presentations. At least one presentation showed the poem on a slide.
- United States Submarine Veterans, Inc. printed "Lost Harbor" in programs for its national conventions.
- One of the largest USSVI chapters published an instruction manual for funerals of submarine veterans. The manual not only specifies when and how "Lost Harbor" will be recited at funerals, but also the poem's musical accompaniment:

Section 3.6: "Farewell Salute Poem": "During the Farewell Salute the chaplain, assistants or a designated Honor Detail member will recite the poem 'Lost Harbor' by Leslie Nelson Jennings."
Section 3.7: "'Taps' Bugler": "'Taps' will be played during the final Farewell Salute 'Lost Harbor' immediately after the command 'Name, rest your oar' is given."

- On the weekend nearest April 11 every year, submarine veterans from across the country gather at New Suffolk Beach, New York, to commemorate the anniversary of the United States Navy's April 11, 1899 purchase of the Navy's first submarine and the opening of the nation's first submarine base. As part of the annual ceremony, a veteran reads the six-line "Lost Harbor."
- Every Memorial Day, Navy veterans gather on the deck of the U.S.S. Requin submarine, permanently moored on the Ohio River in Pittsburgh, next to the Carnegie Science Center. As part of the annual Memorial Day ceremony, a veteran reads the six-line "Lost Harbor."

== Quotations on monuments ==
Jennings' "Lost Harbor" excerpts appear on several monuments to submarine crews and boats, especially his poem's most-quoted sentence: "Sailor, rest your oar." This section lists such monuments and their specific quotations.

- In Memoriam: USS Thresher and USS Scorpion (Mount Pleasant, South Carolina). This monument to two U.S. submarines lost with all hands during the 1960s displays the entire six-line version of "Lost Harbor," but does not include the poem's title nor its author's name.
- New York State Submariners Memorial, (Ballston Spa, New York). Both sides of a black granite wall provide a list of the names of 430 submariners from New York who died during World War II. At the bottom of the wall's reverse, large letters say "Sailor Rest Your Oar."
- The Paddle Bell, (Annapolis, Maryland). The bell carried by the U.S.S. Paddle memorializes the submarines and their crewmen lost during World War II. The bell is supported by a pillar which quotes "Sailor, rest your oar."
- "Sailor Rest Your Oars," (Chattanooga, Tennessee). This monument to "those who have served and will serve" in the U.S. Submarine Service pluralizes "Sailor, rest your oars."
- Silent Service Memorial, (Edenton, North Carolina). A monument to deceased submarine sailors quotes "Sailor, rest your oar."
- Submariners Memorial, (Igo, California). This monument to U.S. submariners quotes "Sailor, rest your oar."
- Submarine Veterans Memorial, (Pensacola, Florida). This monument to deceased submarine veterans quotes "Sailor, rest your oar."
- U.S.S. 09 (SS-70) Memorial, (Portsmouth, New Hampshire). A plaque to those who died off the coast of Portsmouth on the U.S.S. 09 in World War I quotes "Sailor, rest your oar."
- U.S.S. Squalus (SS-192) Memorial, (Portsmouth, New Hampshire). Crew members of the U.S.S. Squalus who died off the coast of New Hampshire in 1939 are memorialized by a plaque which quotes "Sailor, rest your oar."
- U.S.S. Scorpion (SSS-278) Memorial, (Yankton, South Dakota). Granite monument to the crew members of the U.S.S. Scorpion, which vanished during World War II, pluralizes Jennings' text as "Sailors, rest your oars."

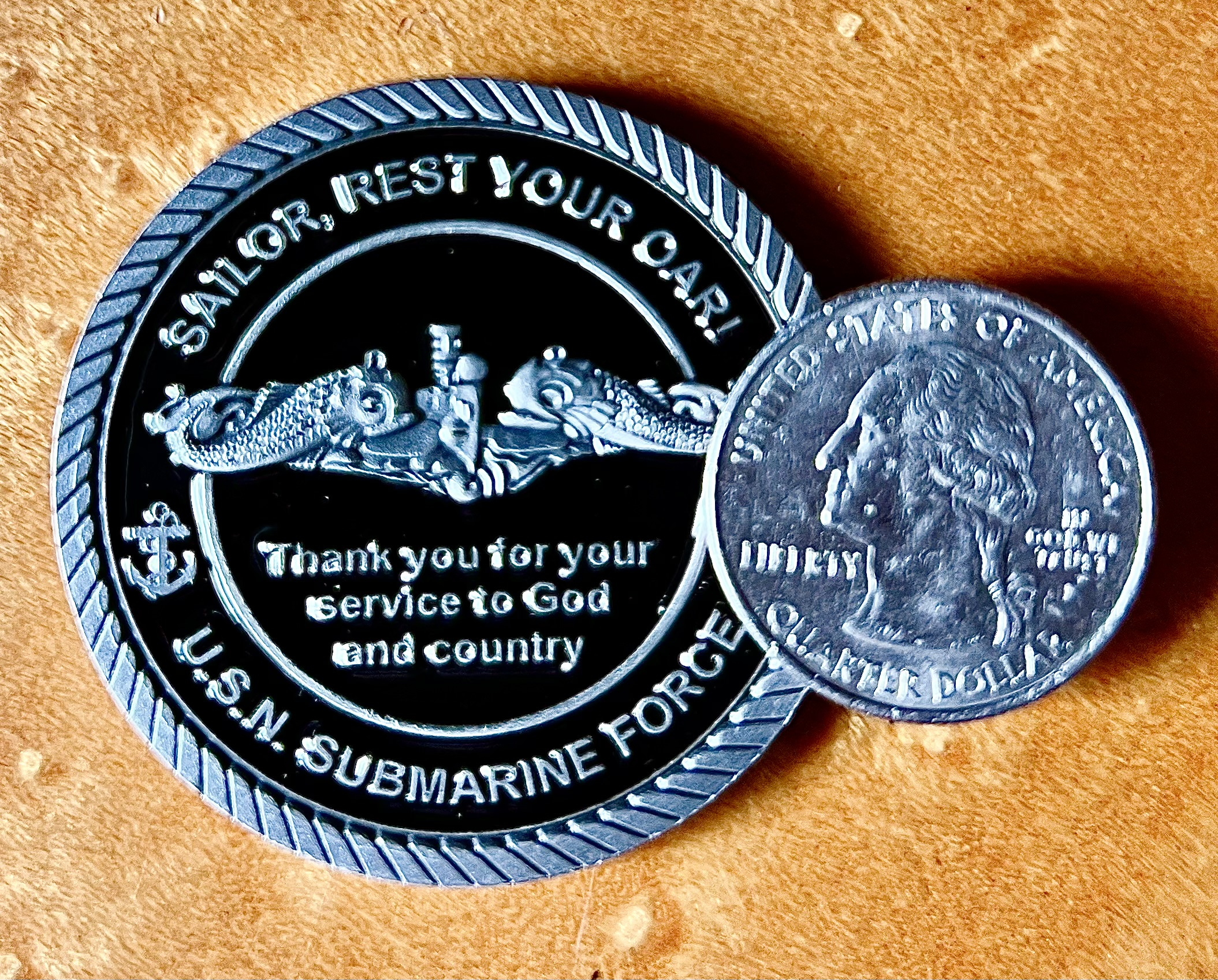
Challenge coin for deceased submarine veterans quotes "Sailor, rest your oar" from Leslie Nelson Jennings poem "Lost Harbor"; quarter shows size.

In addition to the large monuments named above, many personal tombstones of submariners quote "Sailor, rest your oar." United States Submarine Veterans, Inc. provides grave markers with the quotation for its members. The company SS Challenge Coins sells metal grave marker plaques with the quotation and flag holders with the quotation for mounting on tombstones. SS Challenge Coins also makes "Sailor, Rest Your Oar" challenge coins to memorialize individual deceased sailors. Each coin includes Jennings' line and the USSN Submarine Service emblem on its front. The reverse shows a uniformed military trumpeter in front of a United States flag and provides spaces to engrave a veteran's name and other information such as a rank, boat name, or dates.

== Adaptations ==
- "Rest Your Oars" or "Sailor, Rest Your Oars" is a 16-line poem by an unknown author with the first line: “There's a bond between the sea and men most will never know.”
- “Sailor, Rest Your Oar,” a 20-line poem by an unknown author, begins with the first line: “When your final dive is made, and your battery’s running low”.
- "Sailor Rest Your Oar" (without a comma) is the six-line version of “Lost Harbor” turned into a song, with music by singer-songwriter Bobby Reed.

== See also ==
For a synopsis of Jennings' sonnet "Vale" and that poem's text, see The Black Vulture, Critical response.
