= The Wonderful Lips of Thibong Linh =

Book by Theodore Roscoe

- Cover of the first edition
- Author: Theodore Roscoe
- Illustrator: Stephen Gervais
- Cover artist: Stephen Gervais
- Language: English
- Genre: Adventure, Fantasy short stories
- Publisher: Donald M. Grant, Publisher, Inc.
- Publication date: 1981
- Publication place: United States
- Media type: Print (hardback)
- Pages: 193 pp
- ISBN: 0-937986-36-4
- OCLC: 8356723

The Wonderful Lips of Thibong Linh is a collection of adventure and fantasy short stories by Theodore Roscoe. It was first published in 1981 by Donald M. Grant, Publisher, Inc. in an edition of 1,200 copies. The stories originally appeared in the magazines Argosy and Adventure.

== Contents ==
- Author's Note
- "On Account of a Woman"
- "The Squirrel and the Radical Face"
- "The Voodoo Express"
- "The Wonderful Lips of Thibong Linh"
- Author's Postscript
