= Theodore Roscoe =

American writer

- Born: February 20, 1906; Rochester, New York, United States
- Died: May 29, 1992 (aged 86); Florida, United States
- Occupations: Biographer; historian; short story writer; novelist
- Writing career
- Genres: Adventure, Fantasy, History
- Subject: Abraham Lincoln

Theodore Roscoe (February 20, 1906 – May 29, 1992) was an American biographer and writer of adventure, fantasy novels and stories.

== Biography ==
Roscoe was born in Rochester, New York, the son of missionaries. He wrote for newspapers and later pulp magazines. Roscoe's stories appeared in pulp magazines including Argosy, Wings, Flying Stories, Far East Adventure Stories, Fight Stories, Action Stories, Adventure, and Weird Tales. Roscoe travelled widely, included trips to Haiti and North Africa. During a visit to Casablanca, Roscoe befriended a member of the French Foreign Legion. Roscoe later used this man as a model for his fictional Foreign Legion narrator, Thibaut Corday. Roscoe also wrote non-fiction for The American Weekly.

Roscoe's work was praised by H. L. Mencken in a 1929 profile in the Rochester Democrat Chronicle. Mencken said "Many of the so-called literati could learn a lot from Mr. Roscoe. He gets things down with amazing facility".

=== Naval nonfiction ===
During World War II, at the behest of President Franklin Delano Roosevelt the United States military documented its own administrative and operational events for use in producing detailed, definitive histories to be completed after the war. As the United States Navy's contribution, teams of officers produced a 300-volume series titled United States Naval Administrative Histories of World War II, so detailed it was declared "Top Secret" and not published. The series included a two-volume history finished in 1946, Submarine Commands, edited by USN Captain Richard George Voge.

Next the United States Naval Institute commissioned writer Theodore Roscoe to delete secret information and technical descriptions from Submarine Commands and produce for general readers an authoritative history of United States submarine warfare in World War II. Naval Institute published Theodore Roscoe's United States Submarine Operations in World War II in December 1949. The book generated enthusiastic reviews and sold quickly. A second printing was rushed out the next month, then a third in March 1950. Submarine Operations became a required textbook for submarine trainees, and the book kept selling. By December 1965 it had gone through eight printings.

The United States Naval Institute also commissioned Roscoe to write a 737-page book on the history and role of the U.S. Navy (titled This Is Your Navy (1950) and given to navy recruits at boot camp). The Naval Institute followed the big success of his history of World War II submarine warfare with a similar history of destroyers in that war, United States Destroyer Operations in World War II (1953).

Paperback publisher Bantam Books hired Roscoe to condense Submarine Operations to fit into a small mass-market paperback, Pig Boats: The True Story of the Fighting Submarines of World War II. Pig Boats also featured Roscoe's "Submarine Losses" section, including the six-line version of "Lost Harbor." The book was published in December 1958, reprinted the next month, and sold steadily for more than to decades, going into its eighth printing in September 1982.

In Submarine Operations, Roscoe had included a section titled "United States Submarine Losses in World War II." After a list of the 52 lost submarines, Roscoe placed the last six lines of Richard Nelson Jennings' 14-line poem "Lost Harbor", copying it from The Third Book of Modern Verse (1927). Roscoe did not tell his readers that this excerpt was only a portion of "Lost Harbor" and not Jennings' entire poem. Pig Boats also featured Roscoe's "Submarine Losses" section, including the six-line version of "Lost Harbor." The popularity of Roscoe's submarine books made his shortened version of "Lost Harbor" a popular elegy for lost sailors and ships, especially submariners and submarines. Roscoe's six-line version has been recited hundreds of times in memorial ceremonies and funerals for sailors. The best-known sentence of "Lost Harbor" is "Sailor, rest your oar." (It is often pluralized as "Sailor, rest your oars.") That sentence has been quoted many times in printed obituaries, in spoken eulogies, on monuments, and on tombstones for sailors.

Roscoe subsequently wrote several other books on naval history including The Trent Affair, November, 1861: U.S. detainment of a British ship nearly brings war with England (1972).

=== Later fiction ===
A collection of his stories, The Wonderful Lips of Thibong Linh, was published by Donald M. Grant, Publisher, Inc. in 1981. Altus Press published a three-volume collection of his "Thibaut Corday and the Foreign Legion" stories.

=== Biography ===
The biography Pulpmaster: The Theodore Roscoe Story, by Audrey Parente, published by Starmont House (Mercer Island, WA, 1992) was reprinted by Altus in 2012.
