= United States Submarine Veterans, Inc. =

- Logo of USSVI
- Formation: 12 October 1963
- Headquarters: PO Box 1063 Groton, CT 06340-1063
- Members: Over 12,000
- National Commander: Jon Jaques
- Website: www.ussvi.org

The United States Submarine Veterans, Inc. (USSVI) is an organization created by a group from the United States Submarine Veterans of World War II. They shared a belief in the need for an organization open to all United States Navy submariners, from the very beginning of the Submarine Service to the present and into the future - not limited to just those who served so ably in World War II. They wanted to ensure their shipmates who were killed in action on submarines would never be forgotten.

== Purpose ==
Nearly 4,000 submariners have sacrificed their lives on the altar of American freedoms. It is the primary mission of USSVI to perpetuate their memory through memorials and "tolling the boats" memorial services. Per the USSVI Constitution Article III the Purpose/Creed consists of three sections:

=== Creed ===
Section 1: To perpetuate the memory of our shipmates who gave their lives in the pursuit of their duties while serving their country. That their dedication, deeds, and supreme sacrifice be a constant source of motivation toward greater accomplishments. Pledge loyalty and patriotism to the United States of America and its Constitution.

=== Camaraderie ===
Section 2: In addition to perpetuating the memory of departed shipmates, USSVI provides a way for all Submariners to gather for mutual benefit and enjoyment. The common heritage as Submariners is strengthened by camaraderie. USSVI supports a strong United States Submarine Force.

=== Perpetual remembrance ===
Section 3: The organization engages in various projects and deeds that bring about the perpetual remembrance of those shipmates who have given the supreme sacrifice. USSVI also endeavors to educate all third parties it comes in contact with about the services United States submariners performed and how the sacrifices of lost shipmates made possible the freedom and lifestyle Americans enjoy today.

== History ==
=== United States Submarine Veterans of World War II ===
Prior to the founding of the United States Submarine Veterans, Inc. (USSVI), there existed another U.S. submarine veterans association, the United States Submarine Veterans of World War II which still exists today. Founded in July 1955, membership in this organization is limited to submarine crews and relief crews who were on active duty from December 1, 1941, through September 1, 1945. As this organization grew, so did the development and deployment of American submarines across the globe, and it became apparent to many that there was a need and a strong desire for a new organization to include submariners of all eras.

=== Formation of USSVI ===
In the American Airlines Lounge at Dallas Love Field in Texas. Seated are, left to right, Phyllis Lockwood, Joe Negri, Ron Smith, and Charlie Cook.

Fueled by a desire to form a new association, and inspired by the tragic loss of the USS Thresher (SSN-593) on April 10, 1963, a meeting was set for October 12, 1963. Led by Dominic ‘Joe’ Negri and others, the Charter Meeting of USSVI was held in Orange, New Jersey, with 16 representatives present. The Creed and National Bylaws were established at this inaugural meeting. Officers were appointed to serve in an acting capacity until regular elections could be held in the summer of 1964. Robert Link was appointed president; Ken Walkington, vice-president; Joe Burges, Secretary; and Mike Drucker, Treasurer.

=== Incorporation ===
On May 24, 1964, shipmates Joe Negri, Ken Walkington, and Joe Marion met with New London, Connecticut attorney, L. Patrick Gray, Captain, U.S. Navy (Retired) (who later became the Director of the Federal Bureau of Investigation), to legally constitute USSVI as a legal, non-profit organization in the State of Connecticut, with a license to operate and conduct business in all 50 states. The organization was officially incorporated and chartered in New London, Connecticut. The signatories were Joe Negri, Ken Walkington, and Joe Marion. Additional USSVI Plank Owners included Warren ‘Ed’ Gannon, Angelo La Pelosa, Robert Link, Tom Rowan, and Hugh Trimble. They selected former United States Submarine Veterans of World War II National Commander Bob Link as their first acting National Commander. Joe Negri was elected the first Connecticut State Commander and Dick Higham was elected the first Base Commander of Connecticut Base #1, which later became Groton Base. This fledgling organization would soon grow to several hundred shipmates scattered throughout Connecticut, New York, Pennsylvania, Massachusetts, and New Jersey.

=== First National Convention ===
The first National Convention was held in Atlantic City, New Jersey on June 18–20, 1964. Acting President, Robert Link of Absecon, New Jersey was host to the delegates at the Traymore Hotel. Nine eastern states were represented by Ed Sena from New York, Dick Higham from Connecticut, Elmo Wittig from New Jersey, Thomas ‘Doc’ Smith from New Jersey, Herman Schmidt from New Jersey, Art Clarke from Pennsylvania, Joe Negri and Ken Walkington of Connecticut. Commander Charles Carlisle, Commanding officer of USS Tecumseh (SSBN-628), served as guest speaker for the first annual convention. Vice Admiral Charles A. Lockwood was also a guest in attendance.

A new slate of National Officers was elected at the first Convention. Joe Negri was elected National Commander; Ken Walkington, Vice Commander; Joe Burges, Secretary; and Mike Drucker, Treasurer. National Directors were Joe Webb, Dick Higham, and Joe Marion.

=== National Headquarters ===
The Groton Base started operating immediately and held meetings at the K of C in Groton. The attendance at these meetings was between 60 and 75 members. Joe Negri was elected the first state commander and Dick Higman was the first Base Commander. About a year later it was determined that they needed their own building and it was voted to sell raffle tickets (1000 tickets at $10 each) for a gold Cadillac to raise the money for the down payment on the present home at 40 School Street in Groton, Connecticut.

The base building on School Street became a reality in 1966. Due to the fact that the Groton USSVI/Base was incorporated within the State of Connecticut and they had their own building, it was voted that Groton become the National Headquarters of USSVI.

== Organization ==
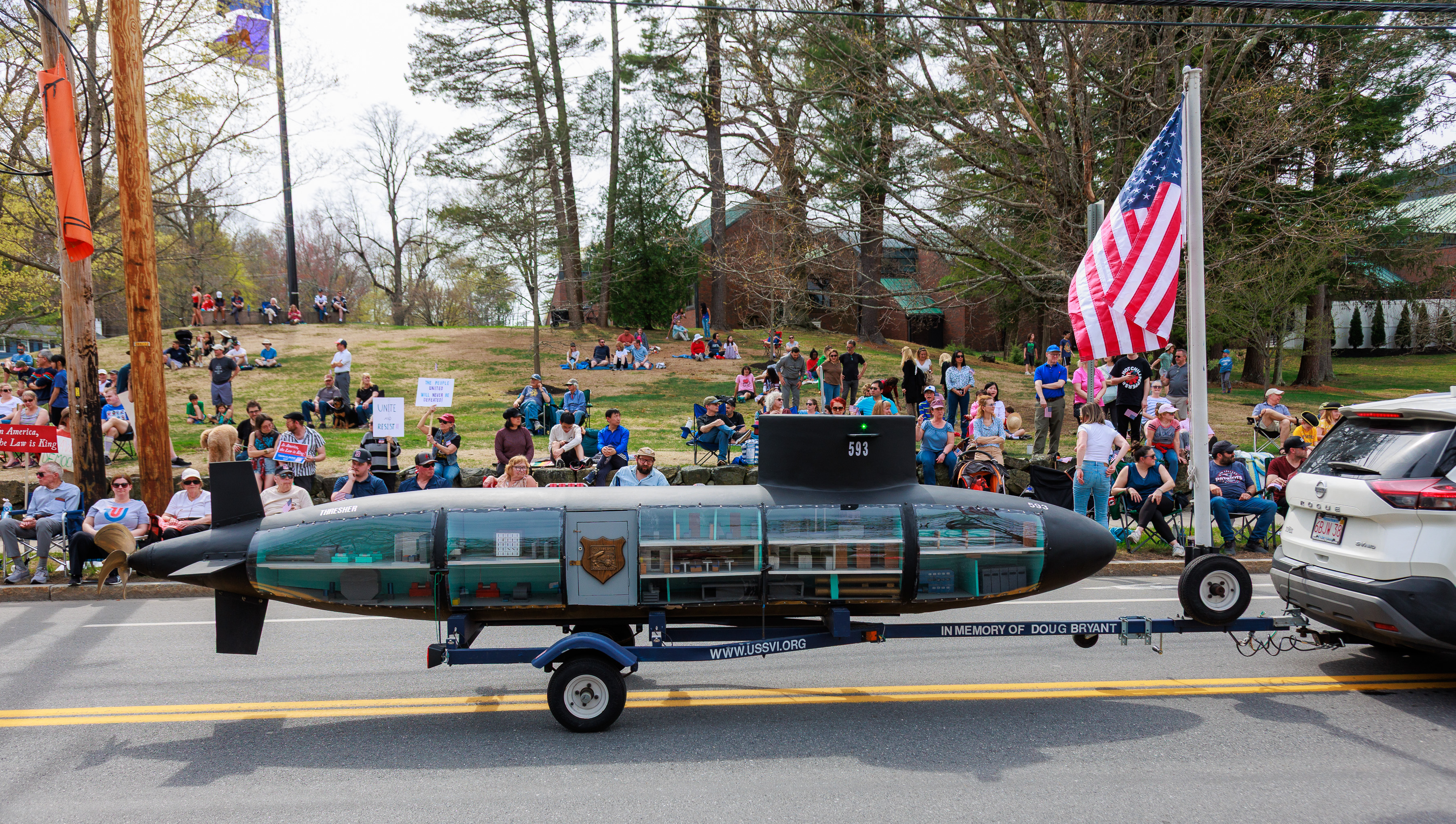
A cutaway model of the USS Thresher serves as a USSVI parade float

=== National officers ===
Nationally elected officers of USSVI are:

- National Commander (NC)
- National Senior Vice-Commander (NSVC)
- National Junior Vice-Commander (NJVC)
- National Secretary (NS)
- National Treasurer (NT)

The prerequisite for National Office is that a nominee must be a Regular Member in good standing a minimum of thirty consecutive months. The term of office for all national officers is two years or until a successor is elected. No individual can serve more than two consecutive terms as National Commander. Other than the position of National Commander, there are no restrictions on the number of terms an individual may be elected to any office.

=== Board of directors ===
The board of directors has the control and general management of the affairs and business of the organization. It is composed of the national elected officers, the regional directors, the District Commander Of The Year, the district commanders, the immediate past national commander, the president of the ladies auxiliary and the commander of the Holland Club.

=== Regional directors ===
Regional directors (SE, NE, Central, and Western) are directly responsible to the national commander for the conduct of organizational business within their region. They serve as members of the board of directors, members of the scholarship committee, and perform other such duties as required by the national constitution and USSVI bylaws.

=== District commanders ===
District commanders serve as non-voting members of the board of directors. They assist the base commanders within their respective districts in the performance of their duties, to include assisting as required to ensure the proper operation of base meetings and events, recruiting and retention. They appoint all district committees, committee chairmen and appointed officers as required to conduct district business. They also approve the base constitution and bylaws, ensuring compliance with national and state laws regulating the operation of the organization within his district (i.e. chartering, maintaining non-profit status).

=== Base commanders ===
Base commanders are responsible for the day-to-day operation of their specific base in accordance with their base bylaws.

=== Structure ===
USSVI is organized by regions, districts, and bases throughout the United States.

Region	District	Bases
Northeast	EN1	9
Northeast	EN2	7
Northeast	EN3	7
Northeast	EN4	5
Northeast	EN5	6
Southeast	ES1	6
Southeast	ES2	5
Southeast	ES4	8
Southeast	ES5	7
Central	CD1	14
Central	CD2	13
Central	CD3	10
Central	CD4	10
Western	WD1	7
Western	WD2	4
Western	WD3	5
Western	WD4	7
Western	WD5	7
Western	WD6	8

=== National Office ===
The National Office is located in Groton, Connecticut and manages membership and administrative services.

=== National Library ===
The National Library is located in North Little Rock, Arkansas at the Arkansas Inland Maritime Museum. The library has a complete set of the following magazines:

- Polaris magazine (which is currently being scanned for archive)
- United States Submarine Veterans of World War II ladies' magazine
- American Submariner magazine (of which about 50% has been scanned for archive)

== Membership ==
USSVI currently has over 12,000 US Submarine qualified members.

=== Regular ===
USSVI Regular membership is restricted to current and former U.S. military personnel, who have been designated "Qualified in Submarines" by authorized U.S. Navy Command Authority, or are regular members of the U.S. Submarine Veterans of World War II.

All are invited to join their shipmates in "Subvets". More information can be found at the USSVI website.

=== Life ===
Regular and Associate Members may become Life Members by paying the National Life Membership fee established in the organization's bylaws. National Life Members will pay no further national dues, but may be required to pay base dues as per base bylaws. A base may offer a member, who is a National Life Member, Base Life Membership, not to exceed the cost of National Life membership.

National Life Membership was inaugurated in 1984 at the National Business Meeting in Groton, Connecticut.

Base Life Membership, in 1985, was voted-in at the Boston Base, available with National Life Membership as a prerequisite.

=== Primary and dual ===
When an applicant selects a base to join, that base becomes his "primary" base. This is done for National voting reasons. National election ballots are distributed according to a member's primary base. A "dual" member is someone who has also joined other bases as their interests dictate. The member may also vote in local base elections through his "dual" base(s), but national election voting is always only done through the member's primary base.

=== Associate ===
An Associate Member is a person who is not eligible for regular membership but is closely associated with a Regular Member.

Each Associate Member must be sponsored by a Regular Member in good standing and are eligible for Life Membership. Associate Membership is reserved for persons not otherwise eligible for regular membership, but who are related to the Submarine Service by their deeds or actions. All Associate Members must be at least sixteen (16) years of age. This does not preclude any relative of a regular member in good standing from applying for Associate Membership.

=== Auxiliary ===
An Auxiliary to the United States Submarine Veterans Inc. has been established and is known as "The Auxiliary of the United States Submarine Veterans, Incorporated". Any base may adopt an Auxiliary at their own discretion; however, the adopted USSVI Bylaws must be approved by the District Commander prior to implementation. Membership in the Auxiliary is limited to USSVI or SVWWII member's wives, widows, siblings, parents and children not less than 16 years of age.

=== Holland Club ===
Any Regular Member who has been designated "Qualified in Submarines" for fifty (50) years or more and who is a member in good standing is eligible to become a member of the "Holland Club" within the organization.

The Holland Club was named after John Philip Holland, an engineer who developed the first submarine to be formally commissioned by the U.S. Navy.

=== Member-at-Large ===
The base or National Membership Chairman may place any member, who chooses, or is assigned to, a base, and who is a National Life Member or whose National annual dues are current, but whose base dues are in arrears, in a category of Member-at-Large. Members-at-Large whose national annual dues are current or who are National Life Members will retain national benefits (i.e. receipt of national magazine and voting on national issues). A Member-at-Large may affiliate with a base at any time by remitting base dues. A Regular base member may transfer to Member-at-Large Status at any time by making a request to his affiliated base or to the National Membership Chair.

== Committees ==
- Membership
- Scholarship
- Ways and Means
- Long Range Planning
- Memorials and Ceremonies
- Public Relations and Publicity
- Nominations
- National Archives
- New Base Development
- Constitution and Bylaws
- Veterans Affairs
- Awards
- National Convention
- Base Commanders Group
- Technology
- Audit

== Charitable funds ==
The USSVI Charitable Foundation (USSVCF) is administered by a board of directors made up of non-paid elected and appointed members. Expenses incurred by the Charitable Foundation are minimal and consist of expenses such as postage, certificates, website fees, stationery supplies, and informative brochures.

The foundation was approved for tax exemption under Section 501(c)(3) of the Internal Revenue Code on December 5, 2000. To facilitate the many activities that may arise, the foundation is split into various dedicated funds.

- Brotherhood Funds
- Building Fund
- General Fund
- Memorial Funds
- Scholarship Funds
- Submarine Library Fund
- Submarine Museum Fund

== American Submariner magazine ==
American Submariner is the quarterly magazine published by USSVI and is a major benefit that all USSVI members receive. The purpose of the magazine is to keep the membership informed of organizational events the latest developments in the U.S. Navy's Submarine force. It also honors tradition, heritage, and service of all submariners, who proudly earned the designation "Qualified in Submarines", by regularly featuring articles about submarines, their crews, and missions conducted during the eras of World War II, Korean War, Vietnam War, and the First Gulf War.

In May 1969, the magazine Submarine National Review came into existence to better establish communications and rapport within the submarine community, with Ken Walkington and Tom Rowan serving as co-editors. It was renamed American Submariner in December 1977. It reverted to Submarine National Review in January 1979 but in July 1991 it was renamed yet again to American Submariner It retained the subtitle of National Submarine Review until 2000.

== Annual National Conventions ==
- 2027: Reno, Nevada
- 2026: Corpus Christi, Texas
- 2025: Orlando, Florida
- 2024: Cleveland, Ohio
- 2023: Buffalo, New York
- 2022: Tucson, Arizona
- 2021: Orlando, Florida
- 2019: Austin, Texas
- 2018: Cruise, Ft. Lauderdale, Florida
- 2017: Orlando, Florida
- 2016: Reno, Nevada
- 2015: Pittsburgh, Pennsylvania
- 2014: Burlingame, California
- 2013: Rochester, Minnesota
- 2012: Norfolk, Virginia
- 2011: Springfield, Missouri
- 2010: Covington, Kentucky, 30 August through 6 September 2010
- 2009: San Diego, California
- 2008: Fort Worth, Texas
- 2007: Seattle, Washington
- 2006: Little Rock, Arkansas
- 2005: Kansas City, Missouri
- 2004: Saratoga Springs, New York
- 2003: Reno, Nevada
- 2002: Duluth, Minnesota
- 2001: Peoria, Illinois
- 2000: Atlantic City, New Jersey
- 1999: Reno, Nevada
- 1998: Hagerstown, Maryland
- 1997: Mobile, Alabama
- 1996: Portland, Oregon
- 1995: Manitowoc, Wisconsin
- 1994: Portsmouth, New Hampshire
- 1993: Vallejo, California
- 1992: Norfolk, Virginia
- 1991: Honolulu, Hawaii
- 1990: Montreal, Canada
- 1989: San Diego, California
- 1988: Rochelle Park, New Jersey
- 1987: Albuquerque, New Mexico
- 1986: Boston, Massachusetts
- 1985: Bremerton, Washington
- 1984: Groton, Connecticut
- 1983: San Diego, California
- 1982: Montreal, Canada
- 1981: Portsmouth, New Hampshire
- 1980: Groton, Connecticut
- 1979: Elmont, New York
- 1978: Honolulu, Hawaii
- 1977: San Diego, California
- 1976: Albuquerque, New Mexico
- 1975: Atlantic City, New Jersey
- 1974: Hampton, Virginia
- 1973: Highland, New York
- 1972: San Juan, Puerto Rico
- 1971: Portsmouth, New Hampshire
- 1970: Chicago, Illinois
- 1969: Boston, Massachusetts
- 1968: Cherry Hill, North Carolina
- 1967: Hempstead, New York
- 1966: Groton, Connecticut
- 1965: New London, Connecticut
- 1964: Atlantic City, New Jersey

== Submarine articles ==
- Submarine warfare
- Ballistic missile submarine
- Deep Submergence Vehicle
- Submarines in the United States Navy
- List of submarine actions
- List of submarine museums
- List of sunken nuclear submarines
- List of lost United States submarines

== See also ==
"Lost Harbor," a poem by Leslie Nelson Jennings, often quoted and reprinted in USSVI publications and at USSVI events.
