= United States Submarine Veterans of World War II =

American veterans' organization

- Logo of SubvetsWW2
- Formation: 15 February 1956
- Headquarters: Rancho Murieta, California
- Members: 3,661 (1980)
- National President: Walter 'Gus' Krause

The United States Submarine Veterans of World War II is a congressionally chartered veterans organization that was established to "perpetuate the memory of those shipmates who gave their lives in submarine warfare" during World War II.

== Purpose ==
In 1956 a group of Plankowners formulated and discussed thoroughly the purpose of a motto of the newly formed organization.

1956 version: "The purpose of this organization is to perpetuate the memory of those shipmates who voluntarily gave their lives in submarine warfare; to further promote and keep alive the spirit and unity that existed among submarine crewmen during WW II; to promote sociability, general welfare and good fellowship among its members; and pledge loyalty and patriotism to the United States government."

In 1970 this 'purpose of' or motto was changed to read: "To perpetuate the memory of those shipmates who gave their lives in submarine warfare; to further promote and keep alive the spirit and unity that existed among submarine crewmen during WW II; to promote sociability, general welfare and good fellowship among its members; and pledge loyalty and patriotism to the United States government."

== History ==
=== Formation ===
The organization got its start on July 4, 1955 when Bud Trimble conceived the idea after futilely searching through veterans' magazines for ten years for a submarine reunion announcement. Being unsuccessful in this endeavor Trimble called his old shipmate Ed Branin and they discussed having a reunion which would include the entire World War II Submarine Service of enlisted men and officers. A two-line reunion announcement was placed in the American Legion magazine Reunions column. Also, a write-up in Walter Winchell's column in the Bethlehem Times-Leader read as follows:

"Veterans of WW II Submarine Service Reunioning in Atlantic City, New Jersey on September 23–25, 1955. Any submarine salt interested in salt water taffy, Contact Hugh Trimble, Bethlehem, Pennsylvania."

=== First National Convention ===
The First National Convention (Reunion) was held at the Ambassador Hotel in Atlantic City, New Jersey on September 23–25, 1955. Sixty or so attendees were senior officers and enlisted men still on active duty as well as many retirees and former mess cooks and deck hands. It was said they had to invite the waiters and bartenders to sit down to make the crowd look bigger. Out of the 60 or so who registered, only 30 stuck out the reunion. There were 21 "Plank Owners" who attended the first National Convention. At this reunion Hugh Trimble was appointed as the 1955 National President (Pro-tem). Ed Branin was appointed as the 1956 National President and Hugh Trimble was appointed Secretary-Treasurer and plans were formulated by the attendees to meet the following year, September 28–30, at the same location. The first National Convention was considered a total success.

=== Events of 1956 ===
Three major events took place in 1956. First was the incorporation of the organization; the second was the Second Annual Convention (Reunion); and third the publication of its very first news bulletin called the Twin Dolphins, published in December 1956. The Twin Dolphins listed the entire constitution and By-laws, a complete list of the charter members, news briefs, and a condensed version of the second (1956) reunion.

The Second Annual Convention (Reunion) was again held in Atlantic City, New Jersey from September 28–30, 1956. Submarine veterans came from all parts of the country, representing every boat active during World War II. As expected, New England and the Eastern Seaboard had the greatest number in attendance. Many men brought their wives. The group gathered for an informal cocktail party and to meet the officers and founders of the organization. A supper was held consisting of steamed clams, corn on the cob, hamburgers, salads, and plenty of beer, socializing long into the night. The next morning the group reassembled for the annual business meeting and election of officers for the new year. A very solemn memorial service was held on the beach front, with Commander Charles Adams, Chaplain, conducting services. After special dedications were made for each individual lost boat, the services were ended with the dropping of a large floral wreath from a plane off the coast. The annual banquet was a gala affair with over 200 in attendance.

Although only in its second year of existence, several states had already organized and District Commanders were appointed to the National Executive Board. Membership had increased 100% in less than one year. If a state did not have a chapter aspiring individuals could give their name to the National President and it would be submitted to the Executive Board for approval. It was in this fashion that the organization experienced rapid growth.

=== Incorporation ===
The organization was incorporated under the laws of the State of New Jersey on February 15, 1956. The certificate of incorporation was recorded at Trenton, New Jersey.

=== Federal Charter ===
At the 1960 San Diego National Convention the first application was made for a Federal Charter. 21 years later after several attempts a Federal Charter was granted on November 20, 1981 during the Ronald Reagan administration under Title 36 of the United States Code, Chapter 2207.

=== World War II Submarine Combat Patrol Insignia ===
On February 19, 1943 the U.S. Navy Department Permanent Naval Uniform Board discussed a directive from Admiral Ernest King for the design of a Submarine Combat Patrol insignia for crew members of submarines participating in successful combat war patrols. On March 26, 1943 Acting Secretary of the Navy James Forrestal approved the insignia and the Submarine Combat Patrol Insignia was established. Regulations provided for award of the insignia to officers and men assigned to submarine duty who completed (since December 7, 1941) one or more patrols during which the submarine sank or assisted in sinking at least one enemy vessel or accomplished a combat mission of comparable importance.

The Submarine Combat Patrol insignia could be awarded to crewmen prior to their designation of Qualified in Submarines. Full pride in the insignia was not realized until it was worn with dolphins. However, the commanding officer of a submarine which conducted a successful war patrol for purposes of awarding the insignia was key in the chain of command for the awarding authority. As such, he could recommend withholding the award of the insignia by advising the appropriate force or type Commander concerning any officer or enlisted man who he felt was 1) incapable of obtaining the designation of Qualified in Submarines or 2) who failed to display proper efforts to become qualified. If such officer or enlisted man failed to Qualify in Submarines or show proper effort, the force or type Commander would, after full consideration of the attending circumstances, withhold the award of the Submarine Combat Patrol insignia.

=== Digger hat ===
The Australian Digger hat is the official headwear of the organization and is worn by members at all official functions. The hats are dark blue in color with a gold band and gold trim on the edges of the brim, with a white plume feather. The hat remains on when at colors and the wearer salutes. When inside a building, the hat is always removed. An exception is the hat is always worn at indoor meetings, it is never removed for prayers, memorial services, or for burials, and is worn during playing of the national anthem.

The hat is credited to Ernst T. Rosing who upon conclusion of the war, brought home an Australian Digger hat. He wore this hat to all meetings and was soon nicknamed Digger by his brother shipmates. During World War II numerous U.S. submarines were operated from Australia from the ports of Fremantle and Brisbane.

=== Vest ===
Vests were never officially adopted as part of the national uniform such as the Digger hats were. However, the majority of the membership and their wives proudly wear a vest to all official events and gatherings. The vests come in an array of colors, but most notably blue with gold trim with the National Organization Insignia on the back, usually with the name of the local chapter, and the names and hull numbers of the submarines served upon. The front of the vests are usually adorned with dolphins, the Submarine Combat Patrol insignia, ribbons, and various unit patches related to the submarines and commands served at.

== Legacy ==
=== World War II ===
The United States Navy Submarine Service lost 52 submarines, 374 officers and 3,131 enlisted men during World War II. These personnel losses represented 16% of the officer and 13% of the enlisted operational personnel. This loss rate was the highest among men and ships of any U.S. Navy unit.

Less than two percent of American sailors served in submarines, yet that small percentage of men and their boats sank 214 Japanese warships. This included 1 battleship, 4 large aircraft carriers, 4 small aircraft carriers, 3 heavy cruisers, 8 light cruisers, 43 destroyers, 23 large submarines and 1,178 merchant ships of more than 500 tons.

In all, U.S. submarines sank more than 55 percent of all Japanese ships sunk. More than surface ships, Navy air and the U.S. Army Air Corps combined.

Fleet Admiral Chester W. Nimitz summarized their efforts after the war by writing:

"We, who survived World War II and were privileged to rejoin our loved ones at home, salute those gallant officers and men of our submarines who lost their lives in that long struggle. We shall never forget that it was our submarines that held the lines against the enemy while our fleets replaced losses and repaired wounds."

=== Status ===
With members of the organization gradually passing away, many of the organizations State Chapters have closed. Due to this inevitable occurrence many members have chosen to become members and/or joint members with their local United States Submarine Veterans Inc. (USSVI) base to carry on their legacy.

=== Submarine Memorials ===
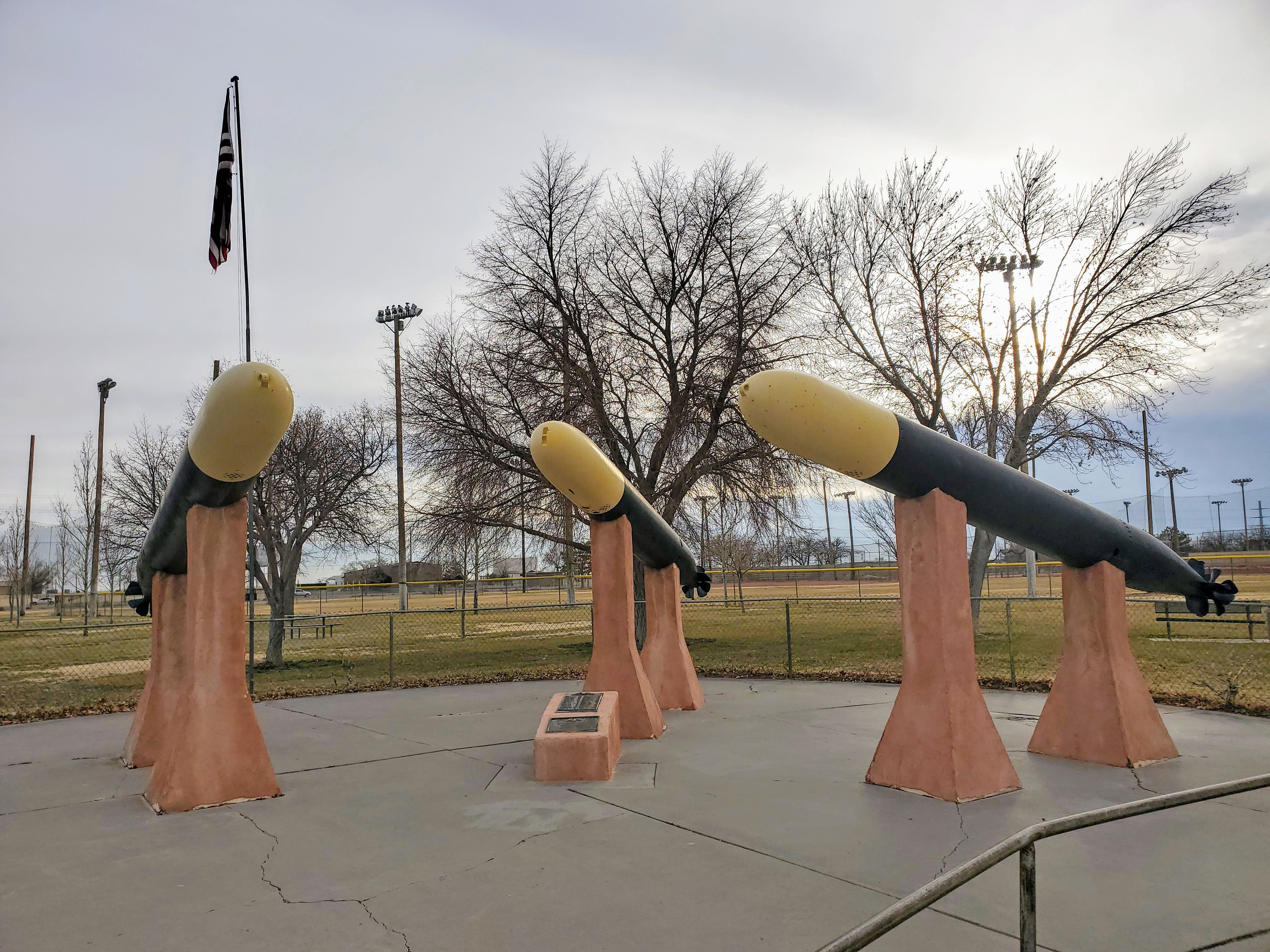
USS Bullhead Memorial Park in Albuquerque, New Mexico, dedicated 7 April 1979

The organization was responsible for the construction and placement of numerous memorials and plaques which honored their fallen comrades and the submarines they served on.

- 52 Boats Memorial, 2010
- Admiral Nimitz Memorial Plaque
- Boys Town Memorial, 1962
- Captain Cromwell Memorial, 1973
- Church Window Memorial, 1975
- Fremantle Submarine Memorial, 1967
- German submarine U-505 Memorial
- Hawaii Memorial Plaque, 1976
- Howard W. Gilmore Memorial, 1975
- John P. Holland Memorial, 1975
- K-13 Submarine Memorial
- Lockwood Memorial, 1968
- Los Angeles Submarine Memorial, 1977
- Louisiana Submarine Memorial
- Massachusetts Memorial for Individuals, 1968
- New Zealand Memorial
- Pearl Harbor Submarine Memorial, 1960
- San Diego Memorial, 1976
- Submarine Memorial, Annapolis, Maryland, 1976
- Submarine Room, American Legion Post #3, Lincoln, Nebraska 1968
- Tennessee Submarine Memorial, 1978
- USS Amberjack Memorial, 1970
- USS Argonaut Hall, 1967
- USS Argonaut Memorial, 1964
- USS Arizona Memorial Plaque, 1974
- USS Balao Memorial
- USS Barbel Memorial, 1960
- USS Bullhead Memorial Park, 1979
- USS Escolar Memorial, 1973
- USS Flasher Memorial
- USS Grayback Memorial, 1970
- USS Grayling Memorial, 1976
- USS Gudgeon Memorial, 1963
- USS Herring Memorial, 1976
- USS Herring Memorial Library, 1974
- USS Nautilus Memorial, 1960
- USS Parche Memorial
- USS Quillback Memorial, 1974
- USS R-12 Memorial, 1963
- USS Runner/Grenadier Memorial, 1972
- USS Scorpion Memorial
- USS Sea Lion Memorial, 1974
- USS Seawolf Memorial, 1967
- USS Shark I Memorial, 1965
- USS Squalus Memorial
- USS Steelhead Memorial, 1960
- USS Swordfish Memorial, 1965
- USS Thresher Plaque
- USS Trigger Memorial, 1977
- USS Trout Memorial, 1962
- USS Trout Memorial, Australia
- USS Tullibee (SS-284) Mississippi Submarine Memorial, 2003
- USS Wahoo Memorial, 1962
- Vallejo Submarine Memorial
- Vernon Palmer Wall Memorial

== Organization ==
The organization is organized by Regions, States and Chapters. Each Region has a Director and each State has a State Commander. Chapters have their own organized structures with Presidents, Vice Presidents, etc. and are governed by By-laws. Many states such as Texas and Florida have multiple chapters.

=== National Officers ===
The nationally elected officers are:

- President
- 1st Vice President
- 2nd Vice President
- Secretary-Treasurer
- Recording Secretary
- Historian
- Public Affairs Officer
- National Chaplains
- Memorial Fund Director
- Scholarship Fund Director
- Polaris Editor

=== Executive Board ===
All officers, together with the Immediate Past President, constitute the Executive Board of the organization which has general administrative powers.

=== State Commanders ===
Each state in the United States has at least one State Commander.

=== Regional Commanders ===
Every region in the United States has a Regional Director and Deputy Regional Director.

=== State Chapters ===
The organization is organized by State Chapters. The respective State Commander is responsible for the day-to-day operation of their specific chapter in accordance with their base Bylaws. At the height of its membership the organization had over 100 chapters.

| REGIONS | STATES |
|---|---|
| NORTHEAST | Connecticut, Maine, Massachusetts, New Hampshire, New Jersey, New York, Pennsylvania, Rhode Island and Vermont |
| NORTHWEST | Alaska, Idaho, Montana, North Dakota, Oregon, South Dakota, Washington and Wyoming |
| NORTH CENTRAL | Illinois, Indiana, Iowa, Kentucky, Michigan, Minnesota, Missouri, Nebraska, Ohio and Wisconsin |
| SOUTHERN | Alabama, Florida, Georgia, Mississippi, South Carolina and Tennessee |
| SOUTH CENTRAL | Arkansas, Kansas, Louisiana, Oklahoma and Texas |
| SOUTHEAST | Maryland, West Virginia, North Carolina and Virginia |
| SOUTHWEST | Arizona, California, Colorado, Hawaii, Nevada, New Mexico and Utah |

=== National Office ===
The National Office is located in Rancho Murieta, California.

=== Submarine Library and Museum ===
Founded by Bernard A. Bastura the museum was located in Middletown, Connecticut. On Labor Day 1966 the museum was officially dedicated to "perpetuate the memory of all the crewmen who lost their lives in WW II." The collection has since been transferred to the Saint Marys Submarine Museum in Kings Bay, Georgia.

== Membership ==
The organization currently has 3,661 members broken down into the following categories, minus Perpetual

=== Regular ===
Membership is restricted to officers and enlisted men of U.S. Navy submarine crews and U.S. Navy submarine relief crews who were on active duty between December 7, 1941 and December 31, 1946.

=== Charter members ===
Members having been accepted for membership prior to and including the closing day of the second National Convention 1956.

=== Honorary membership ===
Upon recommendation of the Executive Board and voting procedure set down in the By-Laws, any person who renders a notable service to the organization may be awarded an honorary membership for the life of the individual.

=== Life membership ===
Was only available to members past their 50th birthday.

=== Perpetual membership ===
All 3,505 American submariners still on eternal patrol as a result of submarine warfare in World War II were made Perpetual members.

== Auxiliary Organizations ==
- Wives of U.S. Submarine Veterans of World War II
- Sons and Daughters of U.S. Submarine Veterans of World War II

== Polaris magazine ==
Polaris was the official magazine of the organization and is no longer published. The magazine received its name at the 1960 National Convention and was named after the North Star, the guiding point for the ancient mariners. The publication contained news pertaining to the submarine veterans, the U.S. Navy, and the outside world.

== National conventions ==
- 2015 - Pittsburgh, Pennsylvania
- 2014 - Burlingame, California
- 2013 - Rochester, Minnesota
- 2012 - Norfolk, Virginia
- 2011 - Springfield, Missouri
- 2010 - Covington, Kentucky
- 2009 - Green Bay, Wisconsin
- 2008 - Helena, Montana
- 2007 - Billings, Montana
- 2006 - Laughlin, Nevada
- 2005 - Salt Lake City, Utah
- 2004 - Houston, Texas
- 2003 - Reno, Nevada
- 2002 - Buffalo, New York
- 2001 - Saint Louis, Missouri
- 2000 - Phoenix, Arizona
- 1999 - Fort Worth, Texas
- 1998 - Albuquerque, New Mexico
- 1997 - Las Vegas, Nevada
- 1996 - Milwaukee, Wisconsin
- 1995 - Salt Lake City, Utah
- 1994 - Norfolk, Virginia
- 1993 - Los Angeles, California
- 1992 - Indianapolis, Indiana
- 1991 - San Antonio, Texas
- 1990 - Kissimmee, Florida
- 1989 - Sparks, Nevada
- 1988 - Milwaukee, Wisconsin
- 1987 - Little Rock, Arkansas
- 1986 - Baltimore, Maryland
- 1985 - Portland, Oregon
- 1984 - Chicago, Illinois
- 1983 - Scottsdale, Arizona
- 1982 - Hartford, Connecticut
- 1981 - Sacramento, California
- 1980 - Saint Louis, Missouri
- 1979 - Mobile, Alabama
- 1978 - Norfolk, Virginia
- 1977 - Seattle, Washington
- 1976 - Denver, Colorado
- 1975 - Nashville, Tennessee
- 1974 - Atlantic City, New Jersey
- 1973 - San Diego, California
- 1972 - Breezy Point, Minnesota
- 1971 - Houston, Texas
- 1970 - Hartford, Connecticut
- 1969 - Portland, Oregon
- 1968 - Cincinnati, Ohio
- 1967 - Omaha, Nebraska
- 1966 - New York City
- 1965 - Hawaii
- 1964 - San Francisco, California
- 1963 - Dallas, Texas
- 1962 - Chicago, Illinois
- 1961 - Philadelphia, Pennsylvania
- 1960 - San Diego, California
- 1959 - Denver, Colorado
- 1958 - Saint Louis, Missouri
- 1957 - New London, Connecticut
- 1956 - Atlantic City, New Jersey
- 1955 - Atlantic City, New Jersey

== Organization closure ==
SVWWII reaffirmed their plan for a formal organizational closure in Norfolk, Virginia at the 2012 convention. Local chapters will continue to function so long as there is an interest in doing so.

== See also ==
- United States Submarine Veterans Inc. (USSVI)

=== Submarine articles ===
- List of lost United States submarines
- Submarine warfare
- Submarines in the United States Navy
- List of submarine actions
- List of submarine museums

== Books ==
- Bastura, Bernard A. (1981). History of U.S. Submarine Veterans of World War II. Middletown, CT: Submarine Library & Museum.
- Roscoe, Theodore (1949). United States Submarine Operations in World War II. Annapolis, Maryland: U.S. Naval Institute Press. ISBN 0-87021-731-3.
- Wittmer, Hinman, Paul and Charles (2014). UNITED STATES SUBMARINE MEN LOST DURING WORLD WAR II, Edition Five, in six volumes. 17 Elannchester Dr., Manchester, Missouri, For details, see: www.subvetpaul.com): P. W. Wittmer Publications LLC. ISBN 978-0-9771456-7-6.
