= German submarine U-467 =

German World War II submarine

History

Nazi Germany
- Name: U-467
- Ordered: 15 August 1940
- Builder: Deutsche Werke, Kiel
- Yard number: 298
- Laid down: 22 June 1941
- Launched: 16 May 1942
- Commissioned: 15 July 1942
- Fate: Sunk by a US Navy aircraft, southeast of Iceland on 25 May 1943

General characteristics
- Class & type: Type VIIC submarine
- Displacement: 769 tonnes (757 long tons) surfaced; 871 t (857 long tons) submerged
- Length: 67.10 m (220 ft 2 in) o/a; 50.50 m (165 ft 8 in) pressure hull
- Beam: 6.20 m (20 ft 4 in) o/a; 4.70 m (15 ft 5 in) pressure hull
- Height: 9.60 m (31 ft 6 in)
- Draught: 4.74 m (15 ft 7 in)
- Installed power: 2,800–3,200 PS (2,100–2,400 kW; 2,800–3,200 bhp) (diesels); 750 PS (550 kW; 740 shp) (electric)
- Propulsion: 2 shafts; 2 × diesel engines; 2 × electric motors.
- Speed: 17.7 knots (32.8 km/h; 20.4 mph) surfaced; 7.6 knots (14.1 km/h; 8.7 mph) submerged
- Range: 8,500 nmi (15,700 km; 9,800 mi) at 10 knots (19 km/h; 12 mph) surfaced; 80 nmi (150 km; 92 mi) at 4 knots (7.4 km/h; 4.6 mph) submerged
- Test depth: 230 m (750 ft); Crush depth: 250–295 m (820–968 ft)
- Complement: 4 officers, 40–56 enlisted
- Armament: 5 × 53.3 cm (21 in) torpedo tubes (four bow, one stern); 14 × torpedoes or 26 TMA mines; 1 × 8.8 cm (3.46 in) deck gun (220 rounds); 1 × twin 2 cm (0.79 in) C/30 anti-aircraft gun

Service record
- Part of: 5th U-boat Flotilla; 15 July 1942 – 31 March 1943; 11th U-boat Flotilla; 1 April – 25 May 1943
- Identification codes: M 19 456
- Commanders: Kptlt. Heinz Kummer; 15 July 1942 – 25 May 1943
- Operations: 2 patrols: 1st patrol: 27 March – 29 April 1943; 2nd patrol: 20 – 25 May 1943
- Victories: None

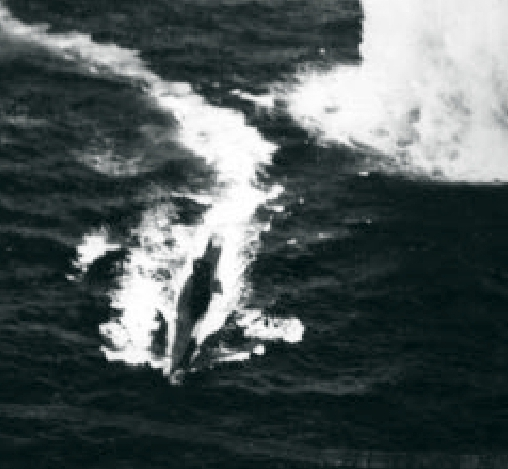
German submarine U-467

German submarine U-467 was a Type VIIC U-boat of Nazi Germany's Kriegsmarine during World War II.

She carried out two patrols. She sank no ships.

She was a member of one wolfpack.

She was sunk by a US Navy aircraft southeast of Iceland on 25 May 1943.

== Design ==
German Type VIIC submarines were preceded by the shorter Type VIIB submarines. U-467 had a displacement of 769 tonnes (757 long tons) when at the surface and 871 tonnes (857 long tons) while submerged. She had a total length of 67.10 m (220 ft 2 in), a pressure hull length of 50.50 m (165 ft 8 in), a beam of 6.20 m (20 ft 4 in), a height of 9.60 m (31 ft 6 in), and a draught of 4.74 m (15 ft 7 in). The submarine was powered by two Germaniawerft F46 four-stroke, six-cylinder supercharged diesel engines producing a total of 2,800 to 3,200 metric horsepower (2,060 to 2,350 kW; 2,760 to 3,160 shp) for use while surfaced, two Siemens-Schuckert GU 343/38–8 double-acting electric motors producing a total of 750 metric horsepower (550 kW; 740 shp) for use while submerged. She had two shafts and two 1.23 m (4 ft) propellers. The boat was capable of operating at depths of up to 230 metres (750 ft).

The submarine had a maximum surface speed of 17.7 knots (32.8 km/h; 20.4 mph) and a maximum submerged speed of 7.6 knots (14.1 km/h; 8.7 mph). When submerged, the boat could operate for 80 nautical miles (150 km; 92 mi) at 4 knots (7.4 km/h; 4.6 mph); when surfaced, she could travel 8,500 nautical miles (15,700 km; 9,800 mi) at 10 knots (19 km/h; 12 mph). U-467 was fitted with five 53.3 cm (21 in) torpedo tubes (four fitted at the bow and one at the stern), fourteen torpedoes, one 8.8 cm (3.46 in) SK C/35 naval gun, 220 rounds, and one twin 2 cm (0.79 in) C/30 anti-aircraft gun. The boat had a complement of between forty-four and sixty.

== Service history ==
The submarine was laid down on 22 June 1941 at Deutsche Werke in Kiel as yard number 298, launched on 16 May 1942 and commissioned on 15 July under the command of Kapitänleutnant Heinz Kummer.

She served with the 5th U-boat Flotilla from 15 July 1942 for training and the 11th flotilla from 1 April 1943 for operations.

=== First patrol ===
U-467's first patrol was preceded by a short journey from Kiel in Germany to Bergen in Norway. The patrol itself began when the boat departed Bergen on 27 March 1943. She headed northwest into the Norwegian Sea.

=== Second patrol and loss ===
Her second foray began with her departure from Bergen on 20 May 1943. On the 25th, she was sunk by a FIDO homing torpedo dropped by a US Navy Catalina flying boat from VP-84.

Forty-six men went down with U-467; there were no survivors.

=== Wolfpacks ===
U-467 took part in one wolfpack, namely:

- Eisbär (30 March – 15 April 1943)

== Bibliography ==
- Busch, Rainer; Röll, Hans-Joachim (1999). German U-boat commanders of World War II : a biographical dictionary. Translated by Brooks, Geoffrey. London, Annapolis, Md: Greenhill Books, Naval Institute Press. ISBN 1-55750-186-6.
- Busch, Rainer; Röll, Hans-Joachim (1999). Deutsche U-Boot-Verluste von September 1939 bis Mai 1945 [German U-boat losses from September 1939 to May 1945]. Der U-Boot-Krieg (in German). Vol. IV. Hamburg, Berlin, Bonn: Mittler. ISBN 3-8132-0514-2.
- Gröner, Erich; Jung, Dieter; Maass, Martin (1991). U-boats and Mine Warfare Vessels. German Warships 1815–1945. Vol. 2. Translated by Thomas, Keith; Magowan, Rachel. London: Conway Maritime Press. ISBN 0-85177-593-4.
- Kemp, Paul (1999). U-Boats Destroyed – German Submarine Losses in the World Wars. London: Arms & Armour. ISBN 1-85409-515-3.
