= VPB-84 =

Patrol Bombing Squadron 84
- Active: 1 October 1941 – 28 June 1945
- Country: United States of America
- Branch: United States Navy
- Type: squadron
- Role: Maritime patrol
- Engagements: World War II

Aircraft flown
- Patrol: PBY-5A Catalina

VPB-84 was a Patrol Bombing Squadron of the U.S. Navy. The squadron was established as Patrol Squadron 84 (VP-84) on 1 October 1941, redesignated as Patrol Bombing Squadron 84 (VPB-84) on 1 October 1944 and disestablished on 28 June 1945. The squadron flew the PBY-5A Catalina throughout its operational history.

== Operational history ==
- 1 October 1941 – 15 April 1942: VP-84 was established at NAS Norfolk, Virginia, under the operational control of PatWing-8. The squadron remained without aircraft during training. In December the squadron was transferred to NAS San Diego, California, for a month of ground and flight training. On 1 February 1942, it was transferred to NAS Alameda, California, for advanced flight training in the PBY-5A Catalina. The squadron then returned to NAS Norfolk in two detachments, departing the West Coast on 12 and 15 April 1942. Two aircraft of the first section of aircraft, led by the squadron commanding officer, crashed into a mountain top while flying in heavy fog near Livermore, California, only one enlisted crew member survived.
- 1 June 1942: Nine VP-84 aircraft departed NAS Norfolk for NAS Argentia, Newfoundland, with a three-aircraft detachment remaining at Charleston, South Carolina. The detachment rejoined the squadron at the end of June.
- 25 September 1942: VP-84 departed NAS Argentia for FAB Reykjavik, Iceland, relieving VP-73 of convoy coverage, ASW patrols and special patrols in cooperation with RAF Coastal Command. Flying was generally conducted under 600-foot (180 m) ceilings, with 2 miles (3.2 km) visibility at a maximum. Days were short during the winter months with only four hours of dim daylight available.
- 5 November 1942: U-408, was sunk by Lieutenant R. C. Millard and his crew. The submarine, caught on the surface, was struck by four depth charges aft of the conning tower while submerging.
- 27 December 1942: Lieutenant H. H. Luce and his crew were killed during extreme turbulence in a squall, crashing on the Keflavik Peninsula.
- 14 May 1943: U-640, was sunk by Lieutenant P. A. Bodinet and crew off Iceland using a Fido homing torpedo.
- 25 May 1943: U-467 was sunk byLieutenant R. C. Millard and crew off Iceland using bombs.
- 11 June 1943: Lieutenant Douglas S. Vieira and crew attempted a water landing to rescue the crew of a ditched RAF B-17 Flying Fortress. During the landing, the aircraft hit a large wave and sank, leaving the crew to join the RAF survivors floating in life rafts. Five days later one survivor was rescued; the others had died of exposure.
- 20 June 1943: U-388 was sunk by Lieutenant E. W. Wood and crew.
- 24 June 1943: U-194, was sunk by Lieutenant J. W. Beach and crew.
- 7 September 1943: The squadron returned to the continental U.S., arriving at NAS Beaufort, South Carolina, on 25 September. During its one-year deployment, the squadron had experimented with several types of armament against the German U-boats. Twin fixed 50-caliber machine guns were found too difficult to operate. A fixed 20-mm cannon obtained from a P-38 squadron worked well, but the best results were obtained from a fixed 50-caliber gun with twin 30-caliber guns in the forward turret. These weapons were used with varying degrees of success in 31 attacks. The primitive ASV Mark II radar sets were less than useless on patrols, as German U-boats could detect the signals of the units and submerge before the aircraft could spot the targets. Upon return to NAS Beaufort, VP-84 came under the operational control of FAW-9.
- 28 November 1943: Lieutenant J. W. Beach and five members of his crew were killed in a crash 2 miles (3.2 km) north of NAS Beaufort. Four other members survived the crash. No cause for the accident was ever determined.
- 18 Dec 1943: The squadron proceeded on to NAS Quonset Point, Rhode Island, where it commenced convoy patrols and coverage of sea lanes off the eastern seaboard out to the 500 miles (800 km) mark. During this period new ASV Mark III radar and airborne LORAN gear were installed, greatly reducing the hazards of navigation in foul weather conditions.
- 11 May 1944: VP-84 was transferred to NAS Coco Solo, Panama, under the operational control of FAW-3. A detachment was sent to Barranquilla, Colombia, to conduct Anti-submarine warfare (ASW) sweeps of the tanker lanes. The detachment rejoined the squadron at NAS Coco Solo on 4 November 1944. Since the Navy had no field for landbased aircraft, the squadron used the Army's New France Field next to the naval air station. A 1 mile (1.6 km) long taxi strip connected the two air bases.
- 11 November 1944 – 12 January 1945: VP-84 received orders to return to NAS Quonset Point. The squadron returned in two sections of three aircraft each, one arriving on 4 December 1944, the other arriving on 12 January 1945. A third four-aircraft detachment remained at NAS Coco Solo to continue convoy patrols. Five of the squadron aircraft of the NAS Quonset Point group received the L8C searchlight installation to assist in ASW sweeps along the Eastern Sea Frontier. At this time there was considerable concern over the ability of the Germans to launch submarine-borne V-1 flying bombs in attacks on major coastal cities.
- 7 April 1945: VP-84 received orders to proceed to NAS Alameda, California. All aircraft and crews, including those of the Coco Solo detachment, arrived safely by 18 April 1945. The squadron came under the operational control of FAW-8 on 20 April, providing support for the United Nations Conference on International Organization being held in the San Francisco area. Patrols were conducted in cooperation with VPB-32. Each squadron flew four eight-hour ASW patrols in the Bay area each day.
- 4 May 1945: PPC Lieutenant (jg) Robert Moment, the squadron executive officer Lieutenant Commander Norman W. White and most of the crew of a squadron PBY-5A were killed in a crash shortly after takeoff. The aircraft encountered fog 2 miles (3.2 km) north of the Golden Gate Bridge and crashed into a hilltop while attempting to get beneath the overcast. Two enlisted crewmen survived the crash.
- 28 June 1945: VPB-84 was disestablished at NAS Alameda. A large portion of the squadron pilots and crews were used for ferry duty on a temporary basis after disestablishment of the squadron.

== Home port assignments ==
The squadron was assigned to these home ports, effective on the dates shown:

- NAS Norfolk, Virginia - 1 October 1941
- NAS Argentia, Newfoundland - 1 June 1942
- FAB Reykjavik, Iceland - 25 September 1942
- NAS Beaufort, South Carolina - 7 September 1943
- NAS Quonset Point, Rhode Island - 18 December 1943
- NAS Coco Solo, Panama - 11 May 1944
- NAS Quonset Point - 11 November 1944
- NAS Alameda, California - 7 April 1945

== See also ==
- Maritime patrol aircraft
- List of inactive United States Navy aircraft squadrons
- List of United States Navy aircraft squadrons
- List of squadrons in the Dictionary of American Naval Aviation Squadrons
- History of the United States Navy
