= List of submarine actions =

This is a list of submarine actions. Submarine actions have been performed in several wars, including the American Civil War (1861 – 1865), the First Balkan War (1912 – 1913), World War I (1914 – 1918), and World War II (1939 – 1945). There have also been four more successful actions since the end of WWII in 1945.

== Actions ==
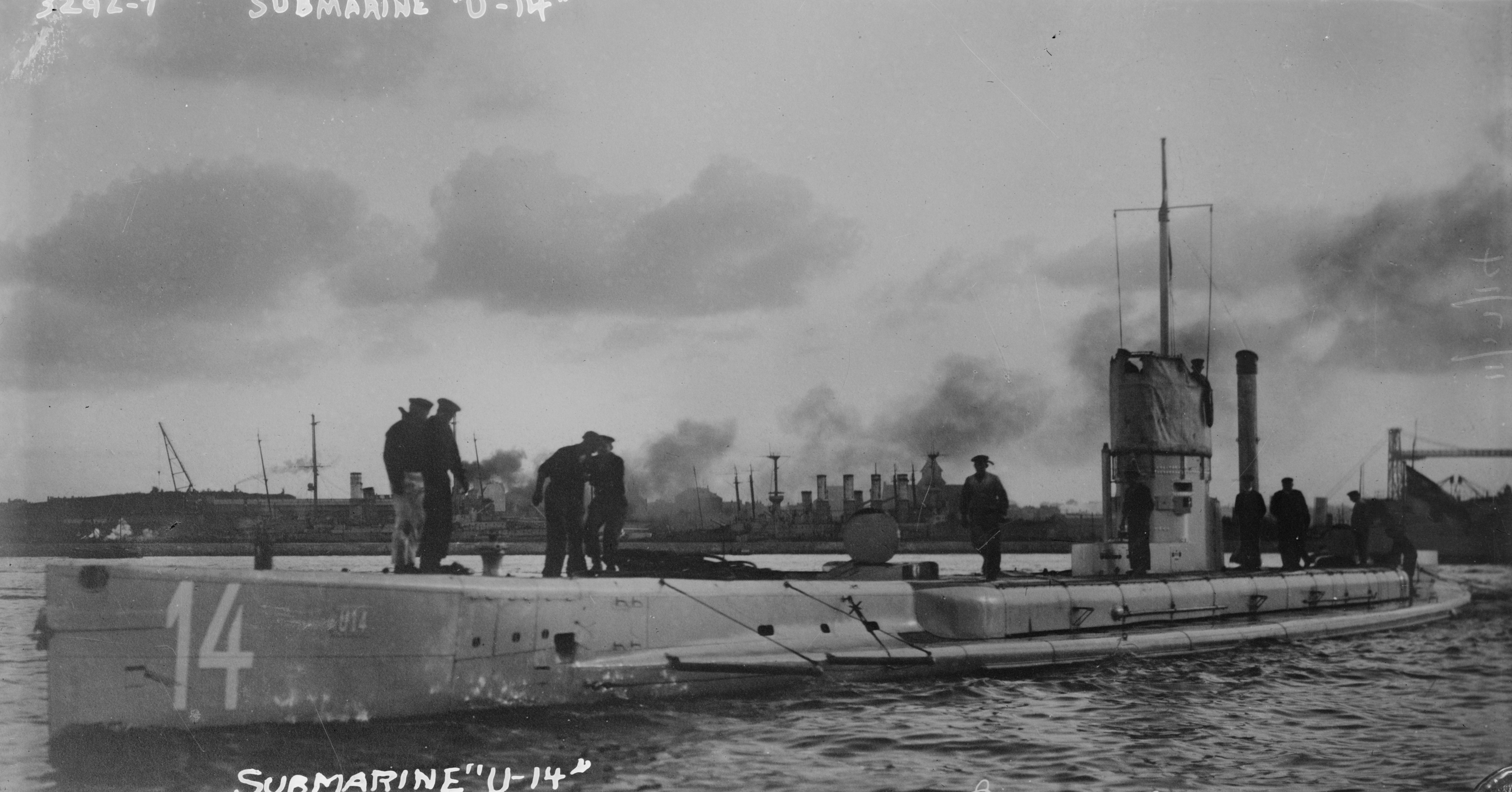
A German World War I-era submarine

=== American Civil War ===
- 1864, February 17 – Confederate human-powered submarine H.L. Hunley sinks the Union sloop USS Housatonic with spar torpedo, off Charleston. H. L. Hunley thus became the first submarine to successfully sink an enemy vessel in combat and was the direct progenitor of what would eventually become international submarine warfare.

=== First Balkan War ===
- 1912, December 9 – Greek submarine Delfin became the first submarine to launch a self-propelled torpedo at an enemy ship, though the ship did not sink due to a weapons malfunction.

=== World War I ===
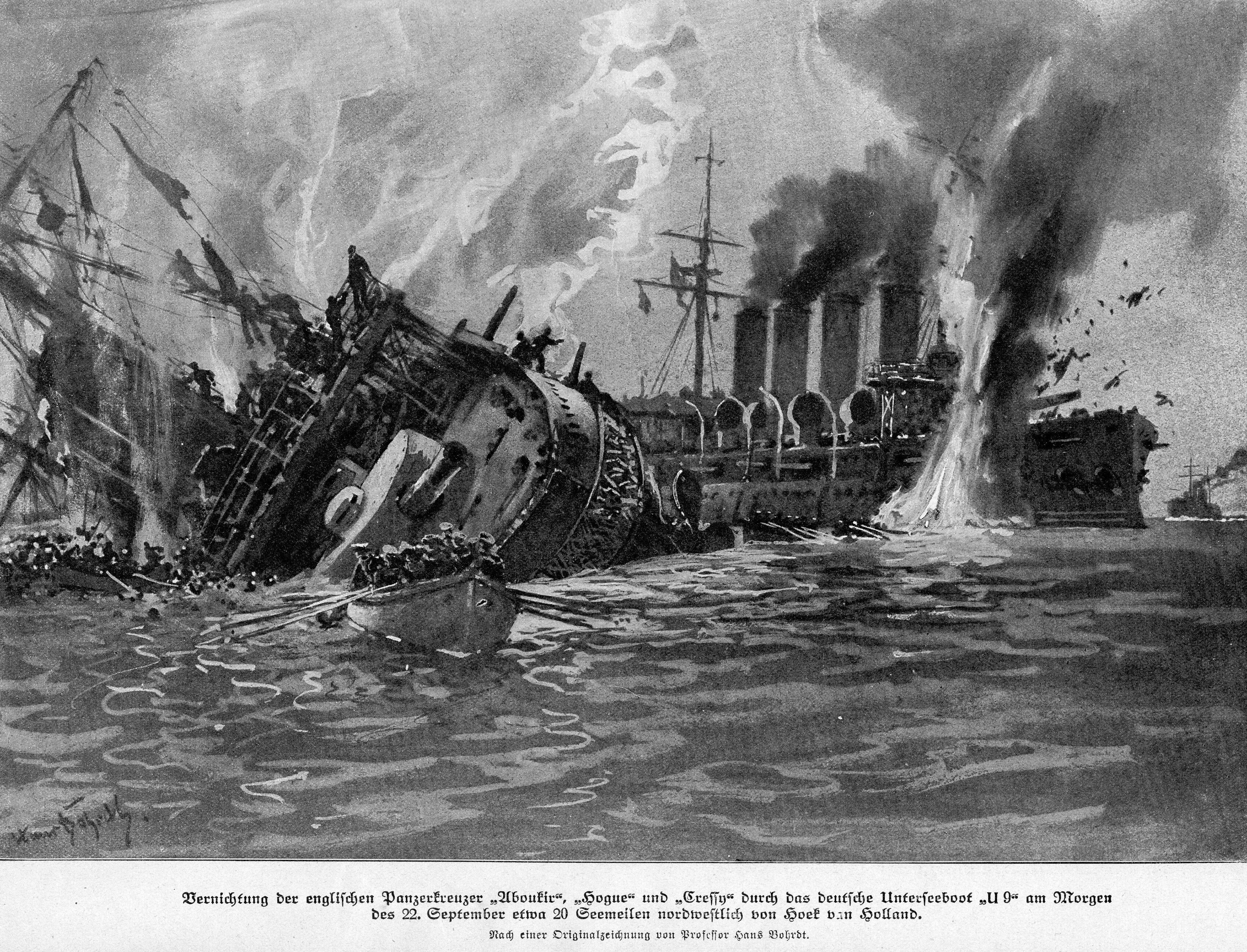
Illustration by Hans Bohrdt depicting the sinking of HMS Cressy, HMS Hogue and HMS Aboukir by U-9 on 22 September 1914 off the Dutch coast.

- 1914, September 5 – HMS Pathfinder is sunk at the start of World War I by U-21, becoming the first ship to ever be sunk by a self-propelled torpedo fired by submarine.
- 1914, September 22 – German submarine U-9 sinks three unescorted British armoured cruisers HMS Aboukir, HMS Hogue and HMS Cressy in approximately one hour.
- 1914, October 18 – German submarine U-27 sinks HMS E3 in the first ever successful attack on one submarine by another.
- 1914, October 20 – German submarine U-17 sinks SS Glitra in the first submarine sinking of a merchant ship during the world wars.
- 1915, May 7 – German submarine U-20 sinks RMS Lusitania killing 1,198 and leaving 761 survivors. The sinking turned public opinion in many countries against Germany, contributed to the U.S. entry into World War I.
- 1915, May 25/27 – In the morning of May 27 German submarine U-21 sinks the British pre-dreadnought battleship HMS Majestic off the Gallipoli peninsula. Two days after the same U-boat sank the pre-dreadnought HMS Triumph near Gaba Nepe.
- 1916, March 22 – German submarine SM U-68 is sunk by HMS Farnborough, a Q-ship (a merchant ship carrying hidden weapons), in the first successful use of depth charges. (Farnborough sank SM U-83 in 1917)

=== World War II ===
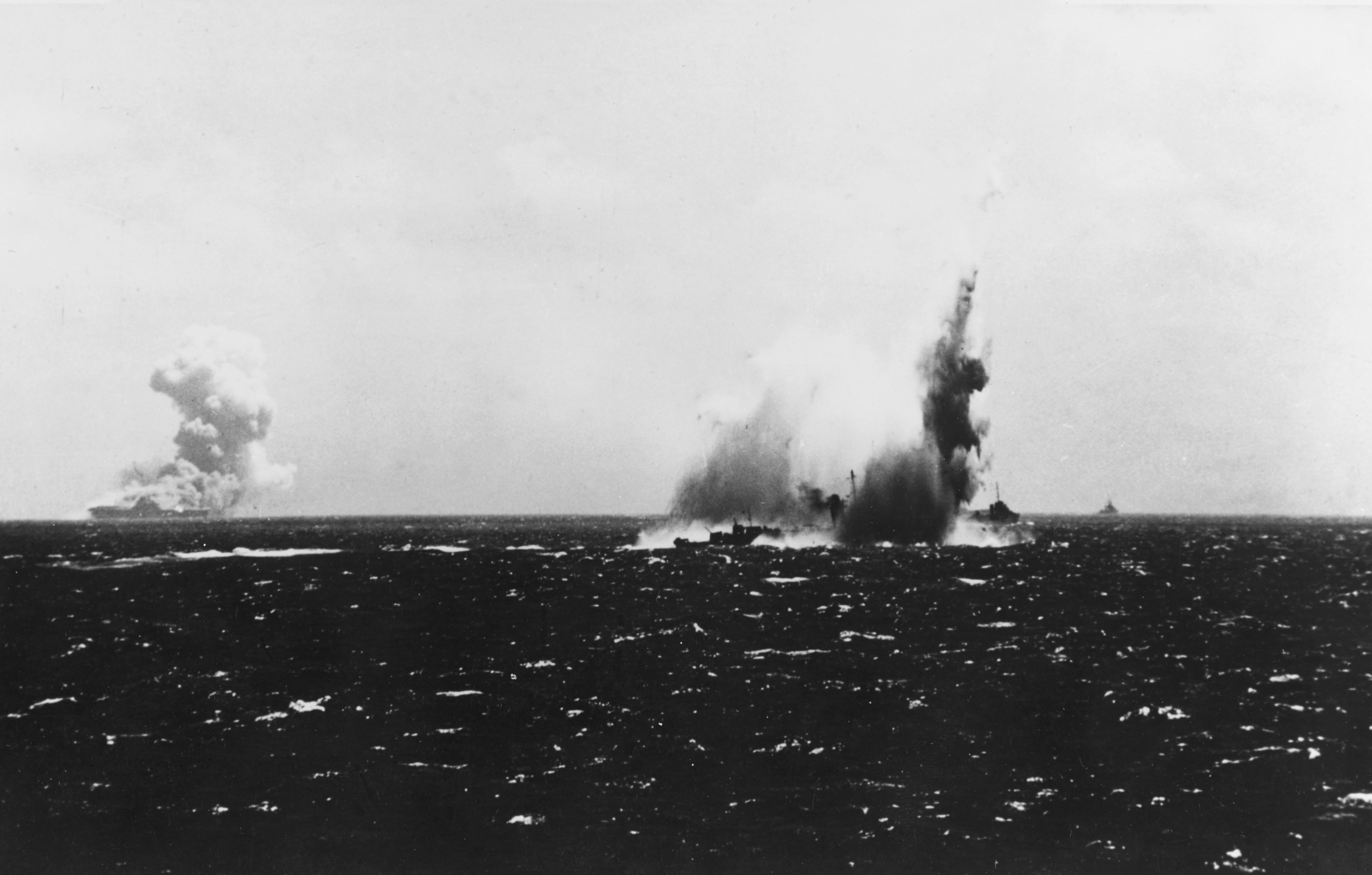
O'Brien hit by torpedo as USS Wasp burns. Both ships were torpedoed and sunk by I-19.

- 1939, September 17 - German U-boat U-29 sinks the aircraft carrier HMS Courageous.
- 1939, October 14 – German U-boat U-47 sinks the battleship HMS Royal Oak in Scapa Flow base. The First Lord of Admiralty Winston Churchill officially announced the loss of Royal Oak to the House of Commons, first conceding that the raid had been "a remarkable exploit of professional skill and daring".
- 1940, October 17–19 – The most effective wolfpack of the world wars including Kretschmer, Prien and Schepke sinks 32 ships from Convoy SC 7 and Convoy HX 79 in two days.
- 1940, November 23 – German submarine U-100 sinks seven Allied merchant ships from Convoy SC 11 in only three hours.
- 1941, November 13 – U-81 strikes the aircraft carrier HMS Ark Royal with a single torpedo. She sinks the following day due to crippling damage.
- 1941, November 28 - Dutch submarine HNLMS O 21 becomes the only submarine to sink another submarine while they were both surfaced when she sinks the German submarine U-95 with a stern torpedo.
- 1942, June 7 - Japanese submarine I-168 sinks the US aircraft carrier USS Yorktown and USS Hammann who was attempting to aid Yorktown from battle damage she had received in the Battle of Midway.
- 1942, September 15 – Japanese submarine I-19 sinks the U.S. aircraft carrier USS Wasp and destroyer USS O'Brien and damages the battleship USS North Carolina with a single salvo.
- 1942, November 13 - I-26 sinks USS Juneau. The dead includes all five Sullivan brothers.
- 1943, March 16–19 – The largest North Atlantic U-boat wolfpack attack of the world wars sinks 22 ships from Convoys HX 229/SC 122.
- 1943, April 29 – May 6 – Convoy ONS 5 is the last major North Atlantic wolfpack attack by surfaced U-boats as escorts demonstrate effective use of radar to sink six U-boats in low-visibility conditions.
- 1943, May 14 – U-640 or U-657 is the first submarine sunk by a homing torpedo.
- 1944, November 29 – USS Archerfish sinks the Japanese aircraft carrier Shinano, the largest vessel of that time.
- 1943, October 31-November 1 – USS Borie and U-405 engage in a pitched battle ending with Borie ramming the submarine. Both ships are lost.
- 1945, January 30 – Soviet submarine S-13 sinks the German ship Wilhelm Gustloff, with older and cautious estimates of 6,000 but more recent estimates of more than 9,000 casualties.
- 1945, February 6 – Royal Navy submarine HMS Venturer becomes the only submarine to sink another submarine while they were both submerged when she sinks U-864 off Norway.
- 1945, April 16 – Soviet submarine L-3 sinks the German ship Goya, with 6,000–7,000 casualties.
- 1945, July 30 - USS Indianapolis is sunk by the Japanese submarine I-58. She suffers the largest loss of life of an American ship.

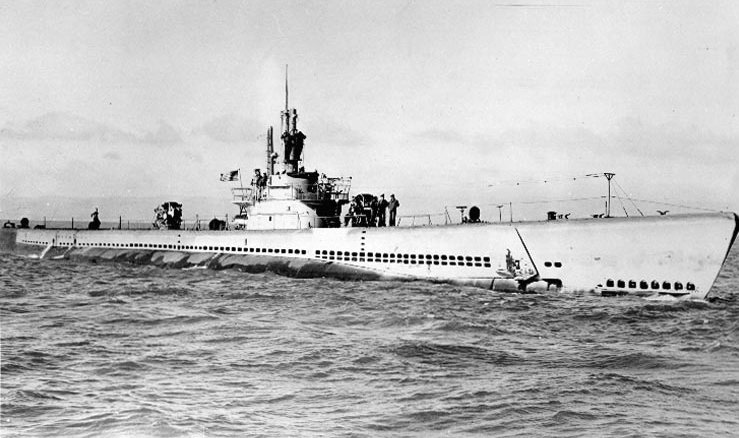
Archerfish undergoing a sea test on 5 June 1945 near San Francisco

=== Post-World War II ===
- 1971, December 9 – Pakistani Daphné-class submarine PNS Hangor during the 1971 Indo-Pakistani War sinks the Indian frigate INS Khukri. This was the first ship sunk by a submarine since World War II. This was the heaviest casualty that the Pakistani Navy inflicted on the Indian Navy in the war. After the attack on Khukri, the Indian Navy ceased its attacks on Karachi and moved the focus of its operations to East Pakistan ports like Chittagong and Cox's Bazar.
- 1982, April 25 - Argentine submarine is attacked by British Wessex, Lynx, and Wasps from HMS Antrim, HMS Plymouth, and HMS Brilliant, being struck by AS.12 air-to-surface missiles, depth charges, and machine gun fire before limping in to Grytviken harbour to surrender.
- 1982, May 1 - Argentine submarine reported firing a SST-4 torpedo at a sonar detection of a British warship, missing its target. This was met by torpedo attacks and depth charges from HMS Yarmouth and HMS Brilliant.
- 1982, May 2 – British nuclear submarine HMS Conqueror sinks Argentine cruiser off the Falkland Islands. It was the first sinking of any vessel by a nuclear-powered submarine in wartime and also the first time that a nuclear-powered submarine fired weapons in an act of war.
- 1982, May 8 - Argentine submarine ARA San Luis fired a Mark 37 torpedo at what they believed to be a British submarine. The torpedo exploded, killing what was most likely a whale.
- 1982, May 10 - Argentine submarine ARA San Luis detected the two British ships HMS Alacrity and HMS Arrow in Falkland Sound and fired two SST-4 torpedoes. One failed to leave its tube while the other struck HMS Arrow's towed decoy. The submarine managed to evade depth charges during the 25-hour counterattack.
- 2010, March 26 – A North Korean two-men midget submarine sinks the South Korean corvette ROKS Cheonan off Baengnyeong Island.
- 2026, March 4 - USS Charlotte sinks the Iranian frigate IRIS Dena off the coast of Sri Lanka.

== See also ==
- List of single ship actions
