= Batard =

Bâtard (Batard in English transliteration) may refer to:

- Bâtard, a type of bread similar to baguette, but shorter
- Bâtard, a short story by Jack London (1902)
- Bâtard-Montrachet, a grand cru vineyard in the Côte de Beaune
- La Batarde, a novel by Violette Leduc (1962)
- Bâtard (restaurant), a French restaurant in New York City

== See also ==
- Bastard (disambiguation)
