= John Barleycorn (novel) =

1913 book by Jack London

- First edition cover
- Author: Jack London
- Language: English
- Genre: Autobiographical novel
- Publisher: The Century Company
- Publication date: 1913
- Publication place: United States
- Media type: Print (Hardcover & Paperback)
- OCLC: 264225

John Barleycorn is an autobiographical novel by Jack London dealing with his enjoyment of drinking and struggles with alcoholism. It was published in 1913. The title is taken from the British folksong "John Barleycorn".

== Themes ==
The novel's themes include masculinity and male friendship. London discusses various life experiences he has had with alcohol and at widely different stages in his life. Key stages are his late teen years when he earned money as a sailor and later in life when he was a wealthy, successful writer.

== Alcohol ==
Alcohol plays a big role in facilitating the themes listed above. The book is about the social facilitation of alcohol, but is also a cautionary tale about the addictive powers of alcohol and its adverse effects on health. London describes the effects of alcohol along both optimistic and pessimistic lines, insisting at some points that it helped him in his developmental process towards becoming a man as he understood the idea and a writer and at other points that it limited in developing him in a healthy way. It remains an important and enduring milestone of his authorial career and of many of the writers of his period, as well as the milestone of many of the social historians of his period. London insisted that historical literature was always more important in his life than alcohol, however.

== White Logic ==
At the beginning of the book, Jack London gives a quick tease of "White Logic", mentioning the "white light of alcohol" and how alcohol presented to his mind the concept of White Logic. It is only in the final five chapters that the nihilism of White Logic is finally revealed and pitted against the "lesser truth" that "makes life possible to persist".

== Seeing pink elephants ==
The first recorded use of pink elephants as the stereotypical hallucination of the extremely drunk occurs at the beginning of chapter two:

There are, broadly speaking, two types of drinkers. There is the man whom we all know, stupid, unimaginative, whose brain is bitten numbly by numb maggots; who walks generously with wide-spread, tentative legs, falls frequently in the gutter, and who sees, in the extremity of his ecstasy, blue mice and pink elephants. He is the type that gives rise to the jokes in the funny papers.

This is contrasted to drinkers such as the narrator, who are possessed of imagination and become drunk more in brain than in body. To them, John Barleycorn sends clear visions of the eventual pointlessness of life and love and struggle.

== Further references ==
- London, Jack (September 10, 1998). "Introduction". John Barleycorn: 'Alcoholic Memoirs'. Oxford University Press. ISBN 9780191605918.
