= The Little Lady of the Big House =

1915 novel by Jack London

- First edition
- Author: Jack London
- Language: English
- Publisher: Macmillan & Co.
- Publication date: 1915
- Publication place: United States
- Media type: Print (hardcover and paperback)

The Little Lady of the Big House (1915) is a novel by American writer Jack London. It was his last novel to be published during his lifetime.

== Plot ==
The story concerns a love triangle. The protagonist, Dick Forrest, is a rancher with a poetic streak (his "acorn song" recalls London's play, "The Acorn Planters"). His wife, Paula, is a vivacious, athletic, and sexually self-aware woman, who falls in love with Evan Graham, an old friend of her husband. Unable to choose between the two men, she wounds herself mortally with a rifle in what her husband is certain is a suicide.

== Inspiration ==
Biographer Clarice Stasz writes that the book is "not autobiography", but speaks of London's "frank borrowing from his life with Charmian", his second wife, and says it is "psychologically valid as a mirror of events during [the] winter [of 1912–13]". Paula, like Charmian, is subject to insomnia and is unable to bear children. Based on a reading of Charmian's diary, Stasz identifies Evan Graham with two real-life men named Laurie Smith and Allan Dunn.

Even minor characters can be identified; Forrest's servant Oh My resembles London's valet Nakata. The long-bearded hobo philosopher Aaron Hancock resembles Frank Strawn-Hamilton, who was a long-term guest at the London ranch. Sculptor Haakan Frolich makes an appearance as "the sculptor Froelig", and painter Xavier Martinez appears under his own name.

== Criticism ==
London said of this novel: "It is all sex from start to finish—in which no sexual adventure is actually achieved or comes within a million miles of being achieved, and in which, nevertheless, is all the guts of sex, coupled with strength." One reviewer disparaged the novel's "erotomania."

Clarice Stasz further comments:

Little Lady upset readers in London's day for its gushing sexual imagery... [and] its close portrayal of the tempting pull of adultery. Modern critics, on the other hand, deride its Victorian coyness and sentimentality, its unrealistic characters. Both were correct—it was too sexy for readers in 1915, when it appeared, and not sexy enough for readers beyond the sexually free twenties.

Kevin Starr, in a negative assessment, describes the novel as "wish-fulfilment". He says it

provides a sort of last will and testament to California possibilities. His ranch life had begun in earnest in 1909 as a moratorium against chaos. Its last literary expression stank of madness and decay. Art and ranching converged in London's last effort, neither sustaining the other.
