= The Dream of Debs =

1909 short story by Jack London

- Short story by Jack London
- Country: United States
- Language: English
- Genre: Short story

Publication
- Published in: International Socialist Review
- Publication type: Magazine
- Publisher: Charles H. Kerr & Co.
- Publication date: Jan. – Feb. 1909

"The Dream of Debs" is a short story by American writer Jack London, first published in the International Socialist Review in serial form in the issues of January and February 1909. It was included in the collection of stories by Jack London The Strength of the Strong, published by Macmillan in 1914.

London was interested in socialism, and this story relates to organized labor. It is one of his stories that could now be regarded as science fiction: set in the near future, the story imagines calamitous consequences of a general strike in the USA.

== Plot summary ==
The narrator, Corf, is a wealthy resident of San Francisco, with several servants. In his student days he wrote an article "The Dream of Debs", about Eugene V. Debs's idea to have a general strike, years before; now he is experiencing the reality. It is enjoyable at first, "a sort of placid adventure". At his club there is a discussion about how the situation arose: the American Federation of Labor collapsed and its place was taken by the (fictitious) ILW (which has called the strike) because, according to one member, organized labor was unfairly treated by employers: "'You smashed all the old federations and drove labor into the ILW.'"

For several days it remains peaceful; there is shortage of some provisions, and there are fewer cars, since they cannot be repaired. Later, the shortage of food becomes serious; law and order starts to break down. Corf and two other members of his club drive to the edge of the city to steal a cow; having killed it, they are joined by others. "We fought and squabbled over the division like savages." They are soon attacked by "the dreaded peace officers of the ILW." Injured, Corf and his friends, after further incidents and the abandonment of their car when a tire blows, return home without meat.

The Dream of Debs was published in pamphlet form during the 1910s by socialist publisher Charles H. Kerr & Co. of Chicago.

A few days later there is a general flight from the city. Corf has little to eat, and his servants have fled. He and three others from the club leave the city on horses, which would soon have been confiscated for food. Corf aims to get to Menlo, where he has a house and livestock. The streets of San Francisco are deserted; there are abandoned automobiles, and soldiers guard public buildings. By contrast, in the working-class district, where ILW men live, families are living happily.

In the country, conditions have become typical of apocalyptic and post-apocalyptic fiction, in which civilization has collapsed and communication has ceased (as there are no newspapers, and telegraph lines have been cut). "Two hundred thousand people had fled from San Francisco... They had swept everything clean. There had been robbery and fighting. Here and there we passed bodies by the roadside and saw the blackened ruins of farmhouses." Corf finds that his house in Menlo has been emptied, and his housekeeper and other employees have all been killed. He eventually returns to San Francisco alone without his horse, which was stolen from him. He finds that the strike has been called off; the demands of the ILW have been granted.

His servants return to him. He cannot discharge them, as they have been unionized by the ILW. The story ends with the narrator writing: "The tyranny of organized labor is getting beyond endurance. Something must be done."
