= The White Silence =

1899 short story by Jack London

- Author: Jack London
- Language: English
- Genre: Fiction
- Publication date: 1899
- Publication place: United States
- Media type: Short story

"The White Silence" is a short story written by American author Jack London in 1899. Like many of London's short stories, it takes place in the Yukon. The story chronicles the travels of three people across the Northland Trail in the Yukon, as they try to reach civilization before spring. This short story deals with the fragile relationship between man and nature, and also between man and animal. Its title is a phrase that London used frequently in his descriptions of the frozen northern landscapes in his stories.

== Characters ==
Mason – Mason is a middle aged man who works on the Yukon. He was born in Tennessee but has worked on the Yukon for many years now. He has made many trips up and down the trails and believes himself to be an expert.

Ruth – Ruth is Mason's wife. She is a native to the Yukon and lives her life oppressed because that is how women are treated in the Yukon. She loves Mason because he treats her as an equal.

Malemute kid – Malemute kid is also a native to the Yukon. He met Mason when he was younger and travels with Mason and Ruth. He has become an apprentice to Mason. "The White Silence" is the first of many Jack London short stories that include the Malemute kid.

== Plot ==
As the story begins, Mason, Ruth and the Malemute kid are on the Yukon Northland trail, the temperature is colder than −50 degrees, and they are trying to reach civilization before the spring. They are running low on food and do not have enough to feed the dogs, so the animals are becoming ravenous. Mason tells the Malemute kid that one of the dogs does not have long to live. Mason attempts to mush the weak dogs up a hill, but once at the top, one of the dogs falls, Mason is swept off his feet and the sled tumbles back, dragging everything to the bottom. Mason whips the dogs savagely, crippling the dog who was previously hurt and angering the other dogs. Ruth and the Malemute kid watch in silence. Later, Mason has just stopped his sled when a massive pine tree comes crashing down on his shoulders.

Malemute kid and Ruth chop away the tree, build a fire and wrap Mason in furs. He has a broken leg, arm and back, and is paralyzed from the waist down. As they set up camp, Mason talks of his home in Tennessee and his previous wife, but mostly he talks of his love for Ruth. He asks Malemute kid to leave him so as to save Ruth and her unborn child. Malemute kid goes out to hunt a moose, which could keep them all alive for weeks, but is unsuccessful. Returning to camp, he finds that the ravenous pack of dogs have gone after their food. Malemute kid with his rifle, and Ruth with an axe, fight off the beasts, but all of their dry salmon is gone.

With only five pounds of flour remaining for the 200 miles of wilderness in front of them, Malemute kid and Ruth have no choice but to continue on their journey without Mason, who has fallen into a coma. Ruth, a native who is not accustomed to showing grief, kisses Mason and blindly takes off on her sled towards civilization. As Malemute kid waits for Mason's death, "the White Silence seemed to sneer, and a great fear came upon him." Mason's heart stops beating, and Malemute kid races in his sled across the snow with Ruth.

== Publication ==
The White Silence was critically acclaimed at the time of publication, and has been repeatedly reprinted. It was first published in the February 1899 edition of the magazine Overland Monthly. It appears in London's story collection, Son of the Wolf, and has been included in Northland Stories, published in 1997. It is the title story of the collection The White Silence and Other Tales of the North.
