= Before Adam =

1907 novel by Jack London

First edition (publ. Macmillan)

Before Adam is a novel by Jack London, serialized in 1906 and 1907 in Everybody's Magazine. It is the story of a man who dreams he lives the life of an early hominid.

The story offers an early view of human evolution. The majority of the story is told through the eyes of the man's hominid alter ego, one of the Cave People. In addition to the Cave People, there are the more advanced Fire People, and the more animal-like Tree People.

Other characters include the hominid's father, a love interest, and Red-Eye, a fierce "atavism" that perpetually terrorizes the Cave People. A sabre-cat also plays a role in the story.

Later scholars have noted strong eugenic themes in Before Adam.
