= The Leopard Man's Story =

- Short story by Jack London
- Country: United States
- Language: English
- Genre: Short story

Publication
- Publication type: Magazine
- Publisher: Leslie's Weekly
- Publication date: 1903

"The Leopard Man's Story" is a short mystery story by Jack London. It was first published in the August 1903 issue of Leslie's Weekly and, in 1906, included in Moon-Face and Other Stories.

== Plot summary ==
The "Leopard Man", a saddened leopard trainer who bore visible scars on his arms and whose personality diametrically opposed his daring profession, tells a tale of a "lion-tamer who was hated by another man" to the narrator. The unnamed man, who hated the lion-tamer, attended every performance in hopes of watching the lion crunch down on his tamer during his "big play", sticking his head in the lion's mouth. Finally, one day he witnessed it.

After pointing out the patience of such a task, the Leopard Man jumped to a story about De Ville, a small "sword-swallowing and juggling Frenchman" known for his quick temper. De Ville struck fear in all but one, 'King' Wallace, a lion-tamer known for sticking his head in the lion's mouth. One day, De Ville caught Wallace looking at Madame de Ville, his wife. Despite warnings about De Ville's temperament, Wallace, while feeling belligerent one day, pushed De Ville's head into a paste bucket. Calm, De Ville cleaned himself off and nothing transpired between the two for several months.

At a San Francisco show, the Leopard Man, looking for his pocket-knife, oversaw Wallace and the rest of the tent occupiers, except for De Ville who glared with hatred at Wallace, watching a quarrel between some trapeze artists. Still watching the events, the Leopard Man noticed De Ville, with his handkerchief drawn, walk past Wallace and feign wiping sweat off his face.

During his performance, Wallace cracked his whip and put his head inside the mouth of Augustus, his preferred lion. With Wallace's head in his mouth, Augustus' jaws clamped together. After the event, the Leopard Man went over to smell Wallace's head and sneezed. De Ville had placed snuff in his hair; Augustus had sneezed.
