= The Law of Life =

- Short story by Jack London
- Country: United States
- Language: English
- Genre: Short story

Publication
- Published in: The Children of Frost
- Publication type: Magazine short story
- Publisher: McClure's Magazine
- Publication date: 1901

"The Law of Life" is a short story by the American naturalist writer Jack London. It was first published in McClure's Magazine, Vol.16, March, 1901. In 1902, it was published in a collection of Jack London's stories, The Children of Frost, by Macmillan Publishers.

== Plot summary ==
This short story covers the last 5 hours of the old and dying Inuit chief Koskoosh. His tribe needs to travel in search of clothing and shelter so he is left to die because of his age and inability to see properly. Even his son has to leave him because he has a new family to feed and take care of.

However, the old Koskoosh is not dissatisfied as he knows the law of life and his desires. He accepts his fate peacefully and starts to visualize the events of his past. The images of both great famine and times of plenty vividly come to his mind. As an experienced person he contemplates nature and ultimately accepts its individualism.

== Animated adaptation ==
The story was adapted into a wordless 9-minute animated short film in 2008. It was the diploma work of director Rishat Gilmetdinov for the Saint Petersburg State University for Film Industry and Television, supervised by Konstantin Bronzit and Dmitriy Vysotskiy, and won the "Best Student Film" award at the 2009 Open Russian Festival of Animated Films.
