= Lost Face =

Collection of seven short stories by Jack London

- First edition
- Author: Jack London
- Language: English
- Genre: Fiction
- Publisher: Macmillan
- Publication date: 1910
- Publication place: United States
- Pages: 240

Lost Face is a collection of seven short stories by Jack London. It takes its name from the first short story in the book, about a European adventurer in the Yukon who outwits his (American) Indian captors' plans to torture him. The book includes London's best-known short story, "To Build a Fire".

== List of stories ==
- Lost Face
- Trust
- To Build a Fire
- That Spot
- Flush of Gold
- The Passing of Marcus O'Brien
- The Wit of Porportuk
