= Virginia Prentiss =

American nanny and community leader

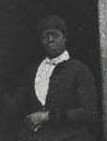
- c.1880
- Born: c. 1832
- Died: 27 November 1922; Oakland, California
- Burial place: Mountain View Cemetery, Oakland
- Citizenship: USA
- Known for: Jack London's nanny

Daphne Virginia Prentiss, also known as "Jennie", "Jenny", or "Mammy Jenny" (c. 1832–November 27, 1922) was an African-American woman who was the foster mother of the writer Jack London and a significant figure in his life. She was also a notable community leader through her work with organisations such as the Federated Negro Woman's Club.

== Early life ==
Prentiss was born into slavery on a plantation in Tennessee around 1832. Baptized Virginia, she was separated from her parents during a sale, and their identities are unknown, other than that her mother was from North Carolina. She was purchased by a John Parker, who owned a plantation near Nashville, and she was forced to be the servant and companion to his youngest daughter. She learned to read and write alongside Parker's daughter and as a teenager learnt domestic skills from Mrs. Parker. During the American Civil War the Parker plantation was destroyed and Prentiss and Mrs. Parker escaped and fled to St Louis. There, Prentiss worked as a maid until stability returned to Tennessee.

On her return to Nashville, she was hired as a housekeeper by a couple named Ruth and Alonzo Prentiss. Soon after, the couple divorced and Alonzo married Virginia. By 1875, the couple were living in San Francisco: Alonzo worked as a carpenter and they had two children, Will and Percella.

== Prentiss and Jack London ==
Early in 1876, Prentiss gave birth to a stillborn child. Around the same time, her neighbor Flora Wellman, who had been abandoned by her partner, gave birth to a son named John (who later became the writer, Jack London). Traumatised by the events leading up to her son's birth, Wellman became very ill and employed Prentiss to take care of him as a wet-nurse and nanny. The arrangement was initially for eight months, but Jack continued to live with Prentiss on and off throughout his teenage years. It was Prentiss who first nicknamed the baby 'Jack', since he jumped on her like a jumping-jack. The connection between the families continued throughout both their lives: they were neighbors in Oakland after Wellman married a veteran named John London. The young London spent much of his childhood with the Prentiss family, including attending services at the First African Methodist Episcopal Church with them. He called her "Mammy Jenny", a name she abhorred. The London family had financial problems and it was Prentiss who lent the 15-year-old Jack London $300 to buy his first boat, a felucca named "Razzle Dazzle" which he used to work as an oyster pirate in San Francisco Bay. She also encouraged him in his early attempts at getting recognition for his writing and encouraged him to enter competitions.

While Prentiss worked as a nanny, nurse and midwife during her lifetime, she also volunteered much of her time and was a prominent figure in the African-American community. She was a leader of the Federated Negro Woman's Club. London's success as a writer did not disrupt their relationship, and later in Prentiss' life he was able to support her. First, Prentiss worked for London looking after his two daughters from his marriage to Bess Maddern. She took on the role in 1903 after the death of her husband, their two children, and her only grandchild. In 1906, London purchased a house for Prentiss at 490 27th Street in Oakland. London's daughter Becky wrote of Prentiss:

Daddy always said that the only love and affection he knew as a child came from Aunt Jennie. He never remembered his mother kissing him. Well, I don't either, Grandma was not demonstrative. Aunt Jennie not only loved Daddy she helped him in many ways, loaned him money, backed him in everything he did. She was a wonderful woman and a friend to everyone. Not only to Grandma but to Daddy and me — a loving friend.

== Later life ==
Prentiss lived at the house London purchased for her until she was no longer able to care for herself. When London predeceased her in 1916, his will gave her a pension for the rest of her life and paid for her funeral expenses. Prentiss lived with dementia until her death on November 27, 1922 at Napa Psychiatric Hospital, aged 91. She was buried in Mountain View Cemetery in Oakland in an unmarked grave.

== Legacy ==
Prentiss rejected white superiority throughout her life; she believed black people to be superior since they were "more Christian". While London did hold racist views (like many other people at the time), his understanding of race was nuanced, and the relationship he maintained with Prentiss had a major impact on his life. Some of his work spoke out against lynching, yet in other stories he perpetuated a caricature of Prentiss as a simplistic woman, a view which did not help to challenge public misconceptions about race. He also insisted on calling her 'Mammy'—a stereotypical term for a black woman that Prentiss repeatedly asked him to not use.

=== Literature ===
In 1991 a fictionalized account of Prentiss and London's relationship was published by Eugene P. Lasartemay and Mary Rudge. Described by critic Tony Williams as "an impressionistic fictionalized biography", he did praise the questions about race that the work raised.

=== Art ===
In 2015, Juan Díaz Canales and Rubén Pellejero made Prentiss one of the characters in Sous le Soleil de Minuit, part of the Corto Maltese series.
