= Moon-Face =

- Short story by Jack London
- Country: United States
- Language: English
- Genre: Short story

Publication
- Published in: The Argonaut
- Publication type: Newspaper
- Publication date: July 21, 1902

"Moon-Face" is a short story by Jack London, first published in 1902. It explores the subject of extreme antipathy.

== Plot summary ==
The story follows the unnamed protagonist and his irrational hatred of John Claverhouse, a man with a "moon-face". The protagonist clearly states that his hatred of him is irrational, saying: "Why do we not like him? Ah, we do not know why; we know only that we do not. We have taken a dislike, that is all. And so I with John Claverhouse." The protagonist becomes obsessed with Claverhouse, hating his face, his laugh, his entire life. The protagonist observes that Claverhouse engages in illegal fishing with dynamite and hatches a scheme to kill Claverhouse.

The protagonist teaches a dog, Bellona, to do one thing and one thing only, retrieval, with emphasis on water retrieving and taking the stick back to the thrower no matter where they were. Claverhouse is presented with Bellona before his upcoming trout fishing trip. The protagonist observes from a distance with glee as Claverhouse lights a stick of dynamite and throws it into the water. Bellona, trained to retrieve, fetches the explosive. Claverhouse runs from the dog in futility until "just as she caught up, he in full stride, and she leaping with nose at his knee, there was a sudden flash, a burst of smoke, a terrific detonation, and where man and dog had been the instant before there was naught to be seen but a big hole in the ground."

The death is ruled an accident while engaged in illegal fishing. The protagonist takes pride in killing Claverhouse with no mess or brutality and lives in peace.

== Plagiarism accusations ==
In July 1901, two pieces of fiction appeared within the same month: London's "Moon-Face", in the San Francisco Argonaut, and Frank Norris' "The Passing of Cock-eye Blacklock", in Century Magazine. Newspapers showed the similarities between the stories, which London said were "quite different in manner of treatment, [but] patently the same in foundation and motive." London explained both writers based their stories on the same newspaper account.
