= Bâtard =

- Short story by Jack London
- Original title: Diable — A Dog
- Country: United States
- Language: English
- Genre: Short story

Publication
- Published in: The Cosmopolitan
- Publication date: 1902

"Bâtard" (English: "Bastard" or "Mongrel") is a short story by Jack London, first published in 1902 under the title "Diable — A Dog" in The Cosmopolitan before being renamed "Bâtard" in 1904.

== Story ==
The story follows Black Leclère and Bâtard, two "devils", one in a man and the other in a wolfdog. Their intense hatred of each other forms the plot as each wants to kill the other, despite their master-pet relationship. At the end, Bâtard ends up killing his owner but is later killed himself.

The story is a study of an animal's reaction to its treatment by man. There were complaints about the way the dog's behavior was described, and London followed up on the same theme with The Call of the Wild.

== Etymology ==
"Bâtard" means bastard or mongrel and "diable" means devil in French. Both are descriptive of the dog.
