= Joseph Morse Greene =

American animal rights activist

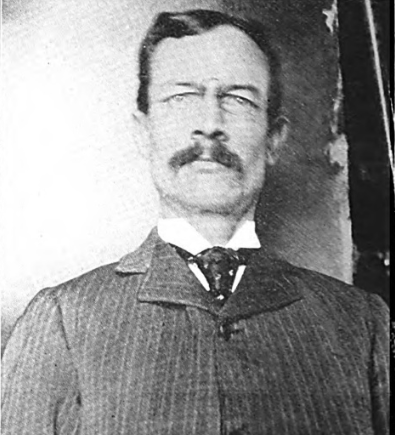
- Born: 1857
- Died: 4 November 1916 (aged 58–59); Neponset, Boston
- Occupation: Activist

Joseph Morse Greene (1857 – 4 November 1916) was an American activist for animal rights and welfare. He was the co-founder and treasurer of the New England Anti-Vivisection Society.

== Biography ==
Greene graduated from Tufts University. He resided at Dorchester, Boston and devoted his career to writing on the behalf of animals. He was a supporter of the Massachusetts Society for the Prevention of Cruelty to Animals and presented arguments against hunting in the daily newspapers of Boston. He authored and distributed articles he had written in leaflet form. He opposed the use of trained animals at the theatre.

Greene was a staunch anti-vivisectionist who argued that vivisection did not advance medical knowledge or relieve human suffering and that it would ultimately lead to human experimentation. He described vivisection as unscientific and a moral deterioration due to the suffering of the animals experimented upon.

In 1890, Greene authored a prize winning anti-vivisection essay for a contest sponsored by George T. Angell of the American Humane Education Society. He was awarded $250. In 1895, Greene founded the New England Anti-Vivisection Society (NEAVS) with Philip G. Peabody. He was corresponding secretary and treasurer of NEAVS. Greene was the editor of their magazine, The Animals' Defender which he used to promote anti-vaccination material.

In the 1890s, Greene testified at Massachusetts State House hearings against professors William T. Sedgwick, Charles W. Eliot and Henry P. Bowditch for promoting animal experimentation. In 1900, he was awarded a gold badge from members of NEAVS in appreciation of his work for the society. In 1901, he was a speaker at an anti-vivisection meeting for the American Humane Society with Elizabeth Stuart Phelps Ward. In 1907, he compiled an anti-vivisection leaflet for the International Ethical Society filled with quotes from eminent medical authorities.

Greene became a strict vegetarian in his later years for ethical and health reasons.

== Anti-vaccination ==
Greene was active in the anti-vaccination movement. In 1901 he authored an anonymous pamphlet titled Vaccination is the Curse of Childhood which offered to connect any applicant with "hundreds of physicians in Massachusetts who are well aware of the uselessness and evil effects of vaccination". The leaflet was widely circulated. The leaflet argued for parents to protect their children from vaccination highlighting uncertainties of the origin of the vaccine lymph and its potential to transmit diseases. It denounced serum therapies as a "blood-poisoning campaign" and compulsory vaccination as an "atrocious crime".

== Death ==
Green died at his home in Neponset, Boston on 4 November 1916, aged 59. Several days before his death he had continued to write at his desk until daylight and had declined to take rest. An obituary in Our Dumb Animals described Greene as a martyr for the cause of animals.

== Selected publications ==
- Vivisection: Five Hundred Dollar Prize Essays. American Humane Education Society. 1891.
- "A Great Unpunished Crime". Theosophy. 12 (4): 170–175. 1897.
- Vaccination is the Curse of Childhood. Boston. 1901.
- "What is Cruelty?". The Open Door. 2 (4): 4–5. 1912.
- "Straight Talk To Drivers". Our Dumb Animals. 49 (8): 116. 1917.
- "The Sport of Killing and Trapping". The Open Door. 11 (11): 8–10. 1922.
