= American Humane Education Society =

American humane education organization (1889–2010)

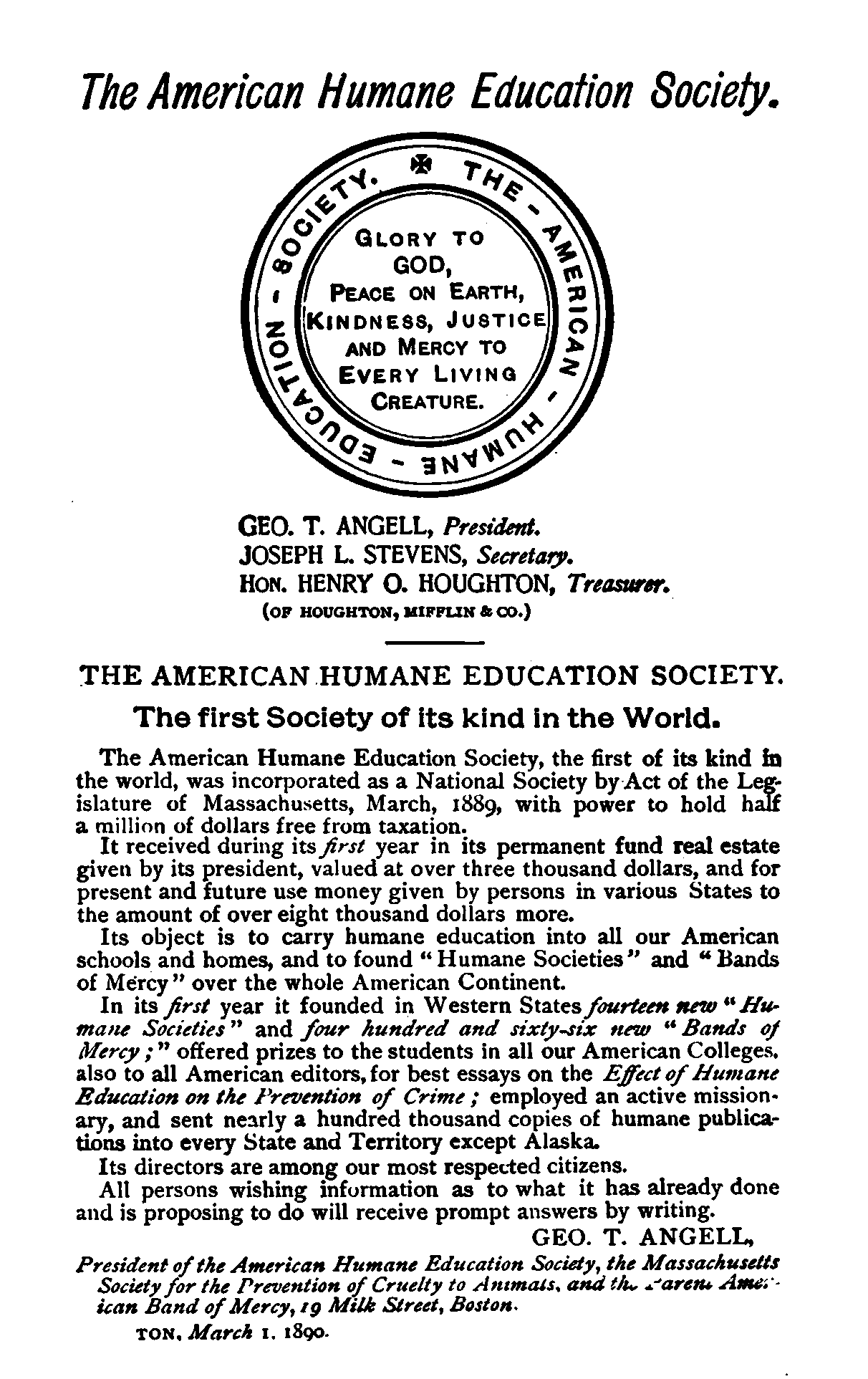
- American Humane Education Society circular, 1890
- Abbreviation: AHES
- Merged into: Massachusetts Society for the Prevention of Cruelty to Animals
- Formation: 1889; 137 years ago
- Founder: George T. Angell
- Dissolved: 2010; 16 years ago
- Purpose: Promoting humane education
- Location: Boston, Massachusetts, United States
- President: George T. Angell
- Main organ: Our Dumb Animals (1889–1970)

The American Humane Education Society (AHES) was an American organization founded in 1889 by George T. Angell in Boston, Massachusetts, to promote humane education. It worked with the Massachusetts Society for the Prevention of Cruelty to Animals (MSPCA), and Our Dumb Animals served as an official publication of both organizations. The society was merged into the MSPCA in 2010.

== History ==
=== Founding ===
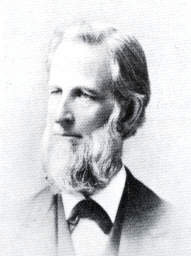
George T. Angell (1823–1909)

George T. Angell (1823–1909) founded the AHES in 1889 with the stated aim of carrying "unsectarian humane education" beyond Massachusetts and supporting the creation of Bands of Mercy and other humane societies. The society's motto was "Glory to God, Peace on Earth, Kindness, Justice and Mercy to Every Living Creature".

On its establishment, AHES membership categories included life memberships and annual memberships at different fee levels.

=== Relationship with the MSPCA and publications ===
The AHES worked in partnership with the MSPCA, and Our Dumb Animals served as an official publication of both organizations.

The society promoted Black Beauty as a humane education text in the United States. It printed an American edition in 1890 and distributed large numbers, with Angell arguing that the book could reduce cruelty to horses.

=== Activities ===
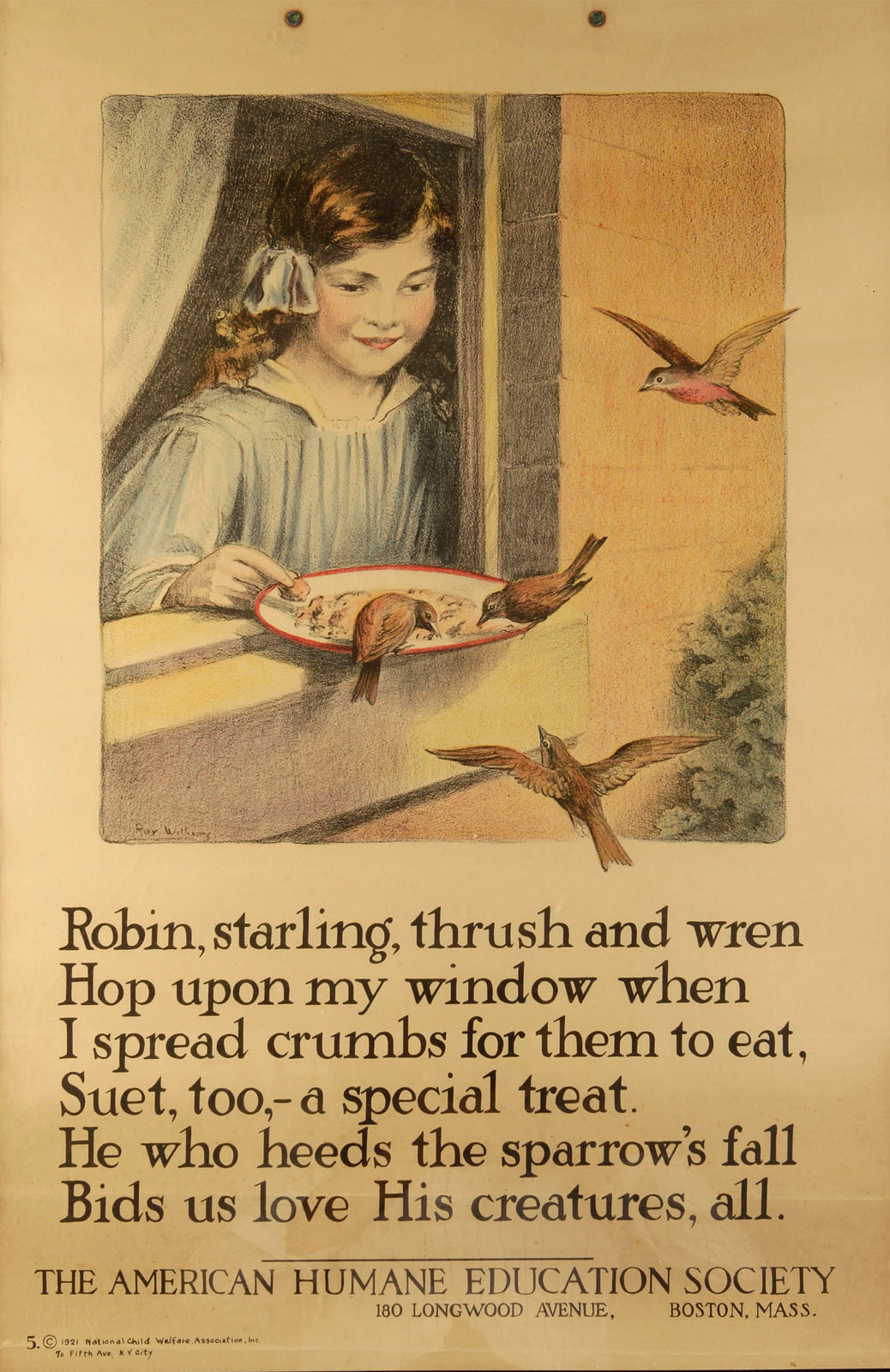
"Feeding the Birds" poster, c. 1921

The AHES distributed pamphlets and other humane education texts. Its activities included poster and essay competitions, illustrated lectures, and advocacy for humane education in school curricula. Fieldworkers operated in the United States and in other countries, including Canada, Turkey, Greece, Switzerland, Holland, France, Mexico, and Cuba.

In 1914, AHES began a "Be Kind to Animals" campaign, using promotional items such as a metal button. The MSPCA's historical timeline records the first national observance of "Be Kind to Animals Week" in 1915.

=== Jack London Club ===
In 1918, the AHES and MSPCA formed the Jack London Club in response to concerns about the use of animals in entertainment. Club members received copies of Jack London's novels Jerry of the Islands (1916) and Michael, Brother of Jerry (1917). By the 1920s, the club had about 750,000 members.

=== Merger ===
In 2010, the AHES was merged into MSPCA-Angell.

== Later coverage ==
In 2012, the National Museum of Animals & Society launched the online exhibition "Be Kind: A Visual History of Humane Education, 1880-1945", curated by Keri Cronin. The exhibition includes a section on the AHES and reproduces selected material associated with its work, including circulars, brochures, posters, and campaign ephemera from the MSPCA-Angell collections.

== Publications ==
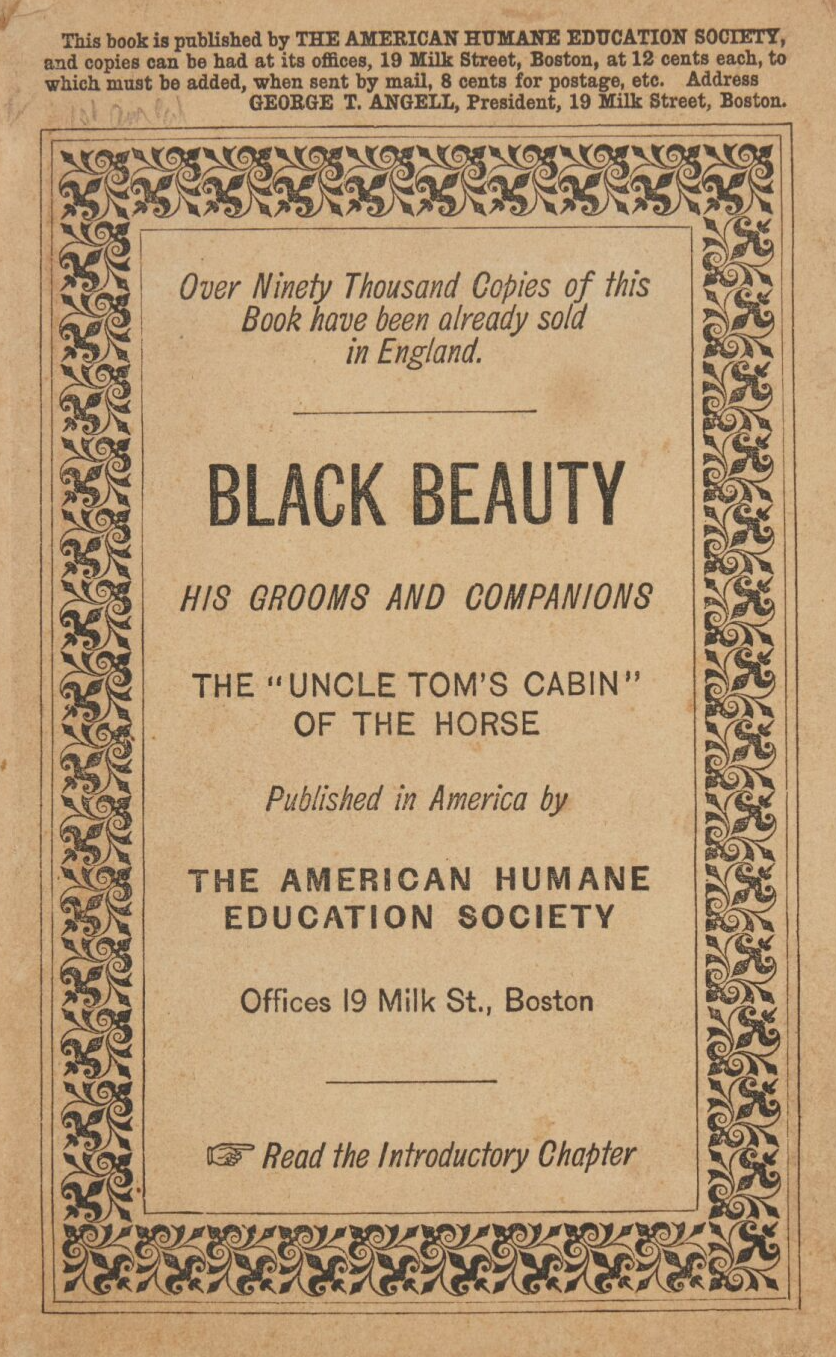
AHES edition of Black Beauty, 1890

- Our Dumb Animals (1889–1970; co-published with the MSPCA)
- Sewell, Anna (1890). Black Beauty (PDF).
- Greene, Joseph M.; Macphail, John A. (1891). Vivisection: Five Hundred Dollar Prize Essays.
- Brown, Theron (1912). The Birds of God.
- Rowley, Francis Harold (1912). The Humane Idea; a Brief History of Man's Attitude Toward the Other Animals, and of the Development of the Humane Spirit Into Organized Societies.
