= Joseph Wade =

Joseph or Joe Wade may refer to:

- Joseph Augustine Wade (1796–1845), Irish composer
- Joseph Marshall Wade (1832–1905), British-American publisher
- Joe Wade (filmmaker), British filmmaker, TV writer and producer
- Joe Wade (footballer) (1921–2005), British footballer and manager
- Joe Wade (trade unionist) (1919–2004), British trade union leader

== See also ==
- Josephine Wade, American businesswoman and restaurant owner
