= Rise for Animals =

American nonprofit organization

- Founded: 1895
- Founders: Philip G. Peabody, Joseph M. Greene
- Purpose: Animal Rights
- Location: Boston, Massachusetts
- Region served: United States
- President: Sarah Luick
- Website: riseforanimals.org

Rise for Animals (formerly New England Anti-Vivisection Society) is a national, registered 501(c)(3) nonprofit animal rights organization which aims to end nonhuman animal experimentation. It has been described as "one of the oldest and wealthiest anti-vivisection organizations in the United States".

== History ==
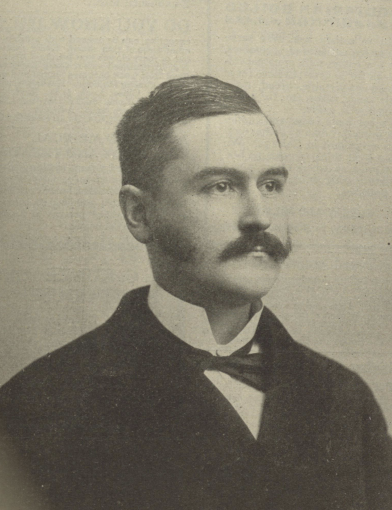
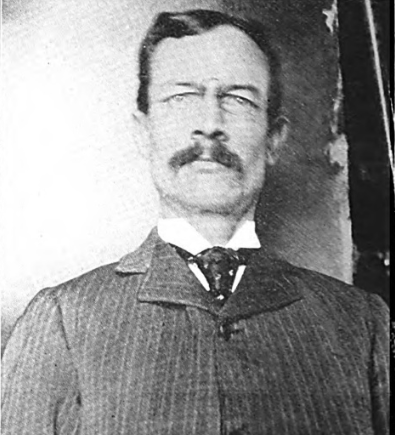
Philip G. Peabody and Joseph M. Greene founders of the New England Anti-Vivisection Society.

The New England Anti-Vivisection Society (NEAVS) was founded in 1895 in Boston, Massachusetts, in response to the migration of European vivisection practices to the United States. In 1871, Professor Henry Ingersoll Bowditch established the first U.S. vivisection lab at Harvard Medical School, inciting concern from Edward Clement, editor-in-chief of the Boston Evening Transcript, which subsequently ran a series of anti-vivisection editorials.

In 1890 George Angell and the Massachusetts Society for the Prevention of Cruelty to Animals (MSPCA) held an essay contest entitled "Why I Am Against Vivisection". The winner of the contest, Joseph M. Greene of Dorchester, Massachusetts, later reached out to lawyer and doctor Philip G. Peabody, one of the contest judges, with the idea of forming an anti-vivisection society. Peabody agreed, and Greene began organizing a number of Boston's influential individuals. The first NEAVS meeting was held at Peabody's house on March 30, 1895, and the first office was opened at 179A Tremont St. in Boston on September 12 of the same year, with Peabody serving as NEAVS president. The first vice-president was Elliott de Belleville Preston.

When Edward Clement became president in 1911, his journalistic expertise boosted both public awareness of vivisection and membership in the organization. George R. Farnum was president of NEAVS from 1938 until his death in 1971.

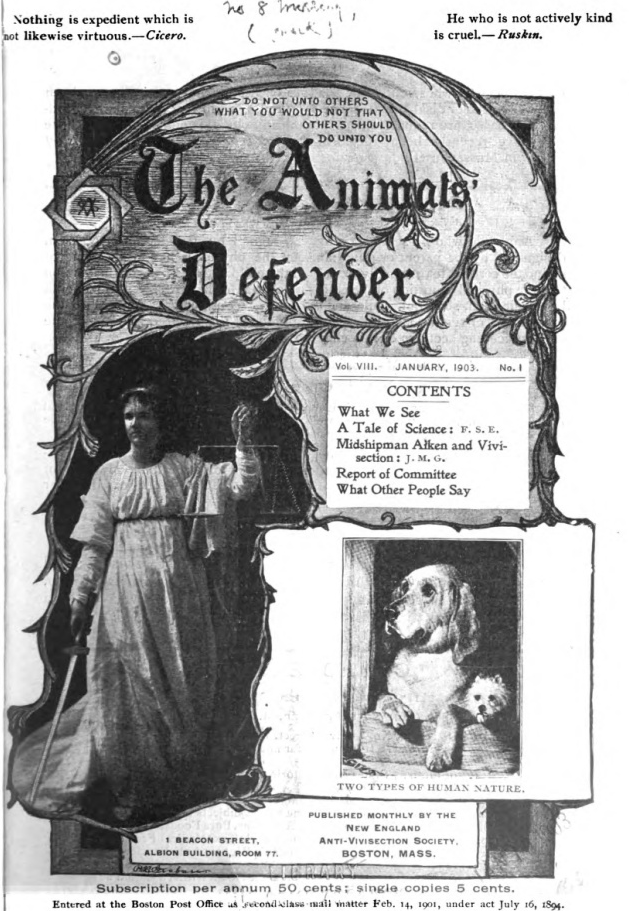
The Animals' Defender published by NEAVS

Author Cleveland Amory was NEAVS president from 1987 until 1998. He has been described as "the founding father of the modern animal protection movement."

In anticipation of his retirement, Amory appointed a nominating committee that chose psychologist and former NEAVS board member, Theodora Capaldo, to succeed him. She was elected NEAVS' first woman president in 1998. Amory died unexpectedly later that same year. Capaldo and her newly elected board of directors came with extensive animal protection and animal rights experience and have included individuals with medical, veterinary, psychology, mental health, sociology, and legal credentials, such as Sarah Luick, a founding member of the Animal Legal Defense Fund (ALDF).

Under Capaldo, the board and staff developed and attempted to implement a succession of new strategies with which to achieve the organization's sole mission of ending the use of animals in science and replacing them with non-animal and scientifically superior alternatives. Highlights of those programs include campaigning to end the use in research of the first nonhuman species, chimpanzees – human's closest genetic relative (Project R&R: Release and Restitution for Chimpanzees in U.S. Laboratories); ending the use of terminal dog labs at the first veterinary school in the country, a curriculum shift later followed by other schools; and, most recently, reaching out to and incorporating other social movements into the animal protection movement. Examples include support for women doing research that does not involve animals and is aimed at understanding, among other things, sex differences' effect on biomedical research results as well as the implications of such differences for the use of other species to extrapolate animal data to human health; and environmentalism through investigation of the serious and detrimental environmental impact that the use and disposal of millions of animals used in research, testing, and education has on the environment (women and the environment are the core of NEAVS' Common Ground campaign).

In September 2017, Nathan Herschler, J.D. began serving as executive director.

The philosophy of NEAVS emphasizes that the use of animals in research, testing, and education is unscientific, as shown in numerous studies; is unnecessary due to the availability of and continuing development of alternatives that yield results superior to animal use; and that the humane and ethical arguments against the suffering and death of millions of animals in labs each year has never been stronger given how modern science shows animal use has limitations, dangers, and is little or no benefit to human health.

NEAVS continued its work through public outreach, education, legislation and policy change, supporting animal sanctuaries, and funding the development of alternatives to animals in research and science education. In September 2020, NEAVS changed name to Rise for Animals.

=== Publications ===
The NEAVS published the New England Anti-Vivisection Society Monthly in the late 19th century. In the early 20th century the magazine changed name to The Animals' Defender. Joseph M. Greene was its editor and used the magazine to promote anti-vaccination material. The Animals' Defender was later renamed the Living Tissue magazine. In 1957, president George R. Farnum stated that the magazine reached 50,000 people.

== Accomplishments ==
=== Draize eye irritancy test alternative ===
In 1981 NEAVS and its sister organization the American Fund for Alternatives to Animal Research (AFAAR) funded research at Tufts University Medical School for an alternative to the Draize test, which applies chemicals such as pesticides, household products, pharmaceuticals, and cosmetics to the eyes of rabbits. The resulting alternative was later used by a number of product and cosmetics companies.

=== Repeal of pound seizure in Massachusetts ===
In 1983 NEAVS successfully lobbied to repeal Massachusetts' 1957 pound seizure law, which required animal shelters to sell animals for use in research. This work resulted in the first and strongest anti-pound seizure law in the U.S. As of 2013, 18 states had banned pound seizure.

=== LD50 alternative ===
In 1985, NEAVS began funding Bjorn Ekwall, chairman of the Cytotoxicology Laboratory (CTLU) in Sweden, a laboratory which designs and validates alternatives to animal research, to develop an in vitro method of toxicology testing capable of replacing the LD50 test, which assesses substance toxicity based on the dose that kills 50% of animals in the test. The resulting test better predicted human lethal blood concentrations.

=== Terminal laboratories in veterinary education ===
In 2000 collaboration between NEAVS and Tufts University's Cummings School of Veterinary Medicine led Tufts to become the first U.S. veterinary school without a terminal lab requirement, a procedure where students train on live animals before euthanizing them. As a replacement, NEAVS helped develop an alternative program involving spay/neuter surgeries for homeless cats. A survey completed by the Humane Society Veterinary Medical Association in 2007 indicated that half of U.S. vet schools no longer require terminal labs in core courses.

=== Dissection choice policy in Massachusetts ===
NEAVS' affiliate, the Ethical Science and Education Coalition (ESEC), lobbied and testified before the Massachusetts state legislature in support of a bill that would have given public school students the right to opt out of dissection classes. In 2004 after the bill was vetoed by Governor Mitt Romney, who said that the decision should be made by the Massachusetts Department of Education, ESEC's continued advocacy led the State Board of Education to issue a policy in 2005 allowing students to choose alternatives to dissection.

=== Protection of chimpanzees from biomedical research ===
NEAVS launched its national Project R&R: Release and Restitution for Chimpanzees in U.S. Laboratories campaign in 2003 to end the use of chimpanzees in invasive biomedical research and provide them permanent homes in sanctuary. Soon after, other organizations allied with NEAVS and after a decade of advocacy the National Institutes of Health (NIH) announced it would retire almost 90% of its chimpanzees to sanctuary.

== Campaigns ==
=== Release and restitution for chimpanzees ===
Launched in 2004, NEAVS' national campaign, Project R&R: Release and Restitution for Chimpanzees in U.S. Laboratories, aims to end all biomedical research using chimpanzees in the U.S. and retire them to sanctuaries.

As part of this campaign, NEAVS published a number of scientific articles in peer-reviewed journals examining the utility of chimpanzees in biomedical research. Paper topics include findings of research chimpanzee autopsy reports, the implications of genetic differences between chimpanzees and humans, and the applicability of using chimpanzees as research models for cancer, hepatitis C, and AIDS.

NEAVS also lobbied Congress in support of the Great Ape Protection and Cost Savings Act (GAPCSA), first introduced in 2008 and again in 2011. If passed, GAPSCA would retire all federally owned chimpanzees to sanctuary and phase out the use of great apes in biomedical research.

In 2010 NEAVS, along with other animal protection organizations, petitioned the United States Fish and Wildlife Service (FWS) to review a policy listing chimpanzees as "endangered" under the Endangered Species Act when found in the wild and "threatened" when in captivity. The petition aimed to reclassify captive chimpanzees as endangered. On June 11, 2013, FWS proposed changing the policy and opened a public comment period.

In 2000, the Chimpanzee Health Improvement, Maintenance, and Protection (CHIMP) Act was signed into law, authorizing the retirement of chimpanzees in research who were "not needed". More than a decade later, roughly 900 chimpanzees remained in U.S. labs and the vast majority were not being used. In 2012, NEAVS and others organizations submitted a rulemaking petition to the U.S. Department of Health and Human Services (HHS) asking for criteria defining when chimpanzees are no longer needed.

On June 26, 2013, the National Institutes of Health (NIH) announced it would move forward with plans to retire almost 90% of its chimpanzees to sanctuary.

=== Ethical Science Education Coalition ===
The Ethical Science Education Coalition (ESEC) is NEAVS' educational affiliate. ESEC's mission is to "end the harmful use of animals at all levels of science education" by providing resources and services that support alternatives to the use of animals in education, specifically the use of animals in terminal labs, live animal demonstrations, training courses, and dissection. ESEC is a proponent of dissection choice legislation and policies which provide students the right to choose alternatives to animal use in their education.

=== Common ground: animals, women, environment ===
NEAVS' Common Ground initiative includes two initial campaigns incorporating support for women in science and environmental stewardship with its animals in research mission. Animal Research is Hazardous Waste examines the millions of animals bred, used, and disposed as contaminated or hazardous waste. NEAVS' Fellowship Grant for Alternatives to Animal Research in Women's Health and Sex Differences funds a woman committed to alternatives to animal methods in the investigation of women's health or sex differences in research results. NEAVS' campaign against hormone replacement therapy drugs made from the urine of pregnant horses encourages women to use alternatives.

=== Alternatives ===
NEAVS supports using alternatives to animals in research, testing, and education, and promotes in vitro, epidemiological, and clinical study data as more predictive for humans. NEAVS funds scientists developing alternatives, and advocates for policies requiring use of validated animal alternatives in research and testing.

In the 21st century billions of animals have been used for human's benefit through animal testing of consumer products, in the United States and dozens of other countries. Laboratories sticking painful eye irritants into restrained rabbit's eyes to test an eye product and cats being forced to have brain electrocutions to test for neurological pharmaceutical drugs are just two of hundreds of products tested on animals according to PETA (peta.org). Animals don't have to be used for human's wants. Scientists Burch and Russell created the 3Rs: reduction, refinement and replacement to further anti-vivisection. In these 3 Rs alternative successful approaches to testing consumer products have been created. Alternatives like in vitro, computer simulations, cell and tissue samples, and mannequins are reducing the millions of sentient animals forced into painful experiments worldwide.

=== American Fund for Alternatives to Animal Research ===
The American Fund for Alternatives to Animal Research (AFAAR) is NEAVS' sister organization. Founded by Ethel Thurston, PhD, in 1977, AFAAR's mission is to "promote and assist the development and use of alternatives to animals in science." Together, NEAVS and AFAAR have funded alternatives to common animal testing procedures such as the LD50 and Draize test for toxicity. Currently, AFAAR and NEAVS offer a one-year postdoctoral fellowship grant to fund women researchers who work to develop, validate, or use animal alternatives in investigating women's health or sex differences in research results.

=== Cruelty-free cosmetics and products ===
NEAVS is a founding member of the Coalition for Consumer Information on Cosmetics (CCIC) and its Leaping Bunny program, which provides consumers with information about certified, cruelty-free companies that do not use animal testing during any product development stage.

NEAVS is also the U.S. Executive Office for Cruelty Free International, founded by the British Union for the Abolition of Vivisection (BUAV). Cruelty Free International works to end the use of animals in product testing worldwide.

=== Legislation and policy ===
NEAVS policy advocacy includes petitioning the U.S. Food and Drug Administration to require, when existing, validated alternatives in place of animal testing through the Mandatory Alternatives Petition (MAP) Coalition, lobbying for dissection choice, petitioning the U.S. Fish and Wildlife Service to list captive chimpanzees as endangered along with wild chimpanzees, and lobbying for the Great Ape Protection and Cost Savings Act (GAPCSA) that would end invasive research on chimpanzees and retire all federally owned chimpanzees to sanctuary.

=== Sanctuary support ===
Through its Sanctuary Fund, NEAVS makes grants to organizations providing lifetime care for animals previously used in research. Sanctuaries funded in the past include Animals Asia Foundation, Chimp Haven, Fauna Foundation, and Save the Chimps. NEAVS also makes lifetime care commitments to animals in sanctuary and helped support the formation of the North American Primate Sanctuary Alliance.

== Presidents ==
1895–1898	Philip G. Peabody
1899	Joseph Marshall Wade
1901–1904	John Thomas Codman
1911–1918	Edward H. Clement
1922–1930	Asa P. French
1938–1971	George R. Farnum
1981–1987	Robert M. Ford
1987–1998	Cleveland Amory
1998–2017	Theodora Capaldo
2018	Gina Weishaupt
2019–present	Sarah Luick

== See also ==
- List of animal rights groups
