= Berkshire Humane Society =

US non-profit organization

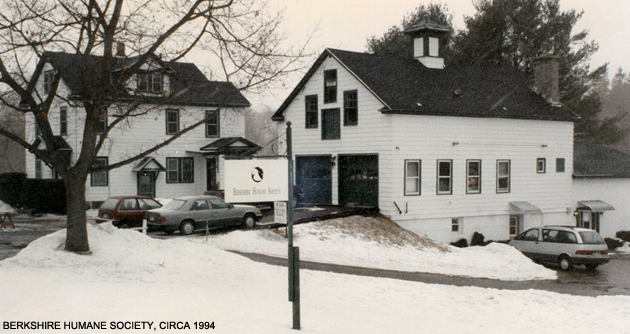
- Berkshire Humane Society circa 1994
- Type: Non-Profit
- Founded: 1992
- Headquarters: 214 Barker Road, Pittsfield, MA 01201; 301 Stockbridge Road, Great Barrington, Massachusetts 01230
- Key people: John Perreault, Executive Director; Cheryl Truskowski, Shelter Manager
- Revenue: 1,266,502 United States dollar (2016)
- Total assets: 4,905,939 United States dollar (2022)
- Website: berkshirehumane.org

The Berkshire Humane Society (BHS) is a private non-profit humane organization in Berkshire County, Massachusetts. Founded in 1992, BHS is an open admissions shelter. The humane society operates animal welfare services and pet adoption facilities in Pittsfield and Great Barrington.

== History ==
The Berkshire Humane Society began operations in 1993 at the site of a former MSPCA-Angell shelter in Pittsfield. Work began on a new facility in 2001, and the following year BHS moved from its original location to a 25,000 square foot facility.

In 2010, BHS established Purradise, an adoption center for cats, in Great Barrington. The shelter houses up to 15 cats at a time.

== Services ==
Berkshire Humane Society's principal services are animal rescue, veterinary care of sick and injured animals, adoption services, spay and neuter services, microchipping, therapy dog training, and obedience training. A full-time staff is employed. Foster care is available for intake animals who need rehabilitation.

The humane society's community services include a pet food bank, which serves about 700 pet owners in the region annually. Since 1992, BHS has offered an animal welfare-focused humane education camp for elementary school-aged children and a classroom education program.

== Fundraising events ==
The humane society does not receive funds from local, state, or federal sources, and is funded privately through donations, bequests, and memberships. Fundraising events have included the Humane Race, a 5K charity run, Woofstock, a pet walk, and annual galas. The humane society also operates Catwalk, a non-profit charity resale boutique staffed by BHS volunteers.
