= Francis H. Rowley =

Baptist minister and animal welfare campaigner

Francis Harold Rowley
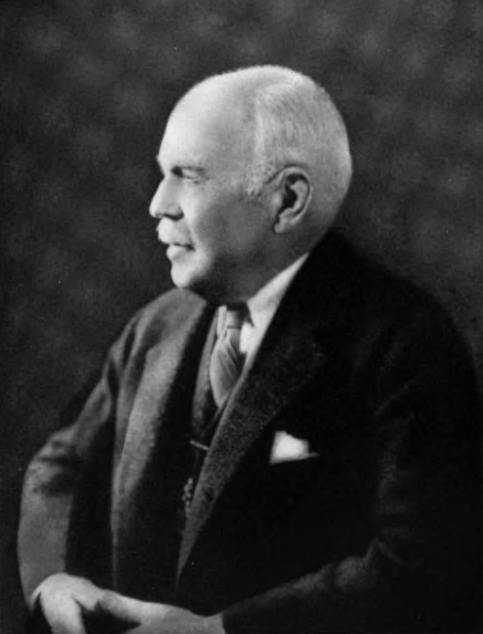
- Born: July 25, 1854; Hilton, New York
- Died: February 14, 1952 (aged 97); Boston, Massachusetts
- Occupations: Baptist minister, animal welfare campaigner

Francis Harold Rowley (25 July 1854 – 14 February 1952) was an American Baptist minister, animal welfare campaigner and hymn writer.

== Biography ==
Rowley was born in Hilton, New York on 25 July 1854. In 1875, Rowley graduated B.A. at the University of Rochester and B.D. at Rochester Theological Seminary in 1878. He was ordained into the Baptist ministry in 1879. He was a pastorate at Baptist churches in Titusville, Pennsylvania during 1879–1884. Rowley was the pastor of the First Baptist Church of North Adams, Massachusetts during 1884–1892. In Boston he served the First Baptist Church until 1910. Rowley was a trustee of the University of Chicago Divinity School, 1894–1896. He preached at Appleton Chapel of Harvard University.

Rowley was a hymn writer best known for authoring the popular hymn I Will Sing the Wondrous Story. It was composed by Rowley's associate Peter P. Bilhorn and was presented to Ira D. Sankey as a gift. Sankey was impressed with the song and published it in Gospel Hymns and Sacred Songs and Solos, in 1887.

He married Isa Amelia on June 11, 1878, they had four children. An honorary Doctor of Divinity was given to him by the University of Rochester in 1895. In 1947, the Rowley School of Human Understanding at Oglethorpe University was established in his honour. Rowley died in Boston, in 1952.

== Animal welfare ==
Rowley took interest in animal welfare and the humane movement. From 1892 to 1900, he was Secretary of the American Humane Association and succeeded George T. Angell as president of the Massachusetts Society for the Prevention of Cruelty to Animals in 1910. Rowley used photographic evidence to reveal the poor conditions and violence towards animals found in slaughterhouses. Most people give little thought to the subject because they do not directly encounter the activities of the slaughterhouse on a daily basis. Rowley aimed to remind people of violence toward animals that was occurring in the slaughterhouse and how people's consumer choices were part of a cycle of cruelty, although not always visible. In 1914, one of the photographs Rowley circulated was titled "For the Sake of a Veal Cutlet". It shows a young calf being slaughtered by two men. The calf is suspended from hooks attached to the slaughterhouse ceiling. The calf can be seen kicking and fighting for his life as a worker slices the calf's fur, skin and muscles, whilst blood pours to the floor.

Rowley acknowledged vegetarianism as an ethical idea but was not personally a vegetarian. He admitted that "the less meat eaten the less the demand that creates the whole traffic in food animals fraught with its many cruelties." Rowley's goal to prevent cruelty was the requirement by law that every animal killed for food would be rendered unconscious first before the knife was inserted. In 1915, through Rowley's influence, a building was made to house the Massachusetts Society for the Prevention of Cruelty to Animals and the Angell Memorial Animal Hospital. He was president of the American Humane Education Society. Rowley was president of both societies until his retirement in 1945. He was responsible for the passage of legislation toward slaughterhouse humane education and reform in Massachusetts.

Rowley was Chairman of the Animal Protection Committee for the Massachusetts Committee on Public Safety and vice-president of the American Society for the Humane Regulation of Vivisection. In 1948, the Massachusetts Society for the Prevention of Cruelty to Animals named the Rowley Memorial Hospital in Springfield, Massachusetts for him in 1948.

== Selected publications ==
- Human Vivisection: A Statement and An Inquiry (with John G. Shortall, 1900)
- A Christmas Conference (1910)
- The Humane Idea: A Brief History of Man's Attitude Toward the Other Animals (1912)
- Slaughter-House Reform in the United States and the Opposing Forces (1913)
- Slaughter House Reform (1914)
- The Gnat and the Camel (1920)
- The Teacher's Helper in Humane Education (1920)
- The Horses of Homer (1930)
- An International Appeal (1935)

== Gallery ==
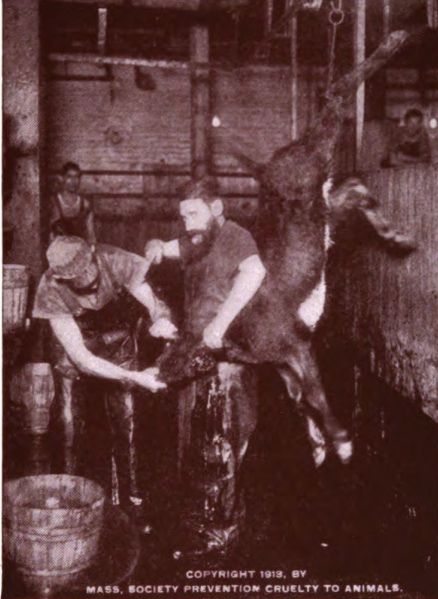
For the Sake of a Veal Cutlet, published by Rowley in 1914

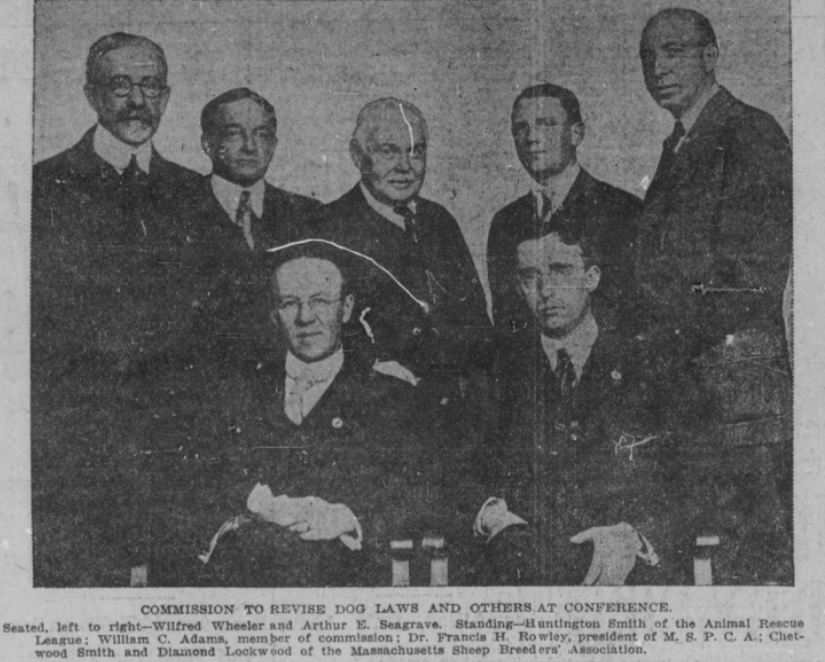
Francis H. Rowley and others, 1918

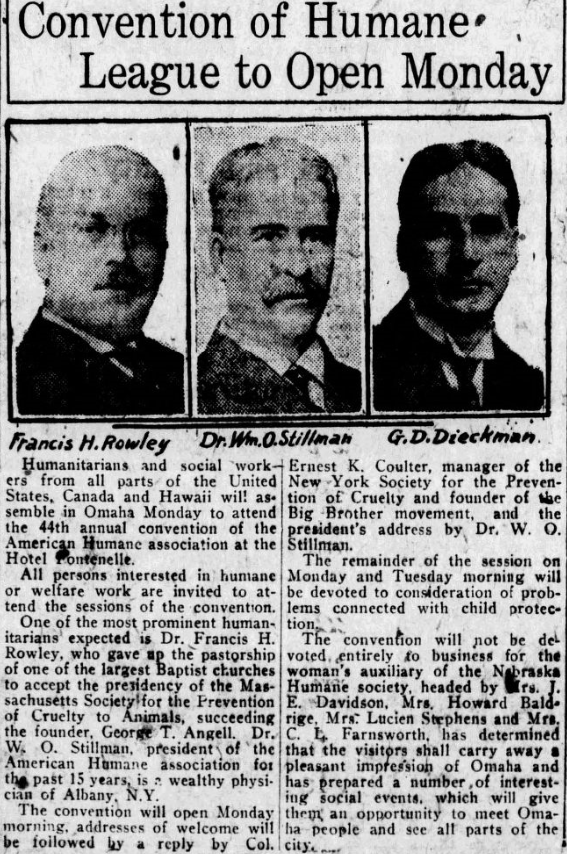
Newspaper article, 1920
