= Jean Holzworth =

American veterinarian (1915–2007)

- Born: March 26, 1915; Port Chester, New York, U.S.
- Died: January 13, 2007 (aged 91); Lake Waramaug, Connecticut, U.S.
- Education: Bryn Mawr College (Ph.D., 1940); Cornell College of Veterinary Medicine (1950)
- Occupations: Veterinarian, philologist
- Years active: 1940s–1987
- Employer: Angell Memorial Animal Hospital
- Known for: Feline medicine

Jean Holzworth (March 26, 1915 – January 13, 2007) was an American veterinarian known for her work in feline medicine. She initially acquired a doctorate in Latin and taught at Mount Holyoke College, before retraining in veterinary medicine in the 1940s. Between 1950 and 1986 she practiced at the Angell Memorial Animal Hospital in Boston, specializing in the care of cats. She was among the first to document a number of disorders affecting the species, including feline infectious peritonitis and hyperthyroidism, and was editor of the well-regarded 1987 book Diseases of the Cat.

Holzworth has been described in professional literature as "the definitive expert in feline medicine of her generation" and noted for her "immeasurable importance" to the field.

== Early life ==
Jean Holzworth was born on March 26, 1915, in Port Chester, New York. She grew up on a farm in Connecticut, where as a young girl she reportedly operated an amateur veterinary clinic for the farm cats and marked their deaths using a "Cat's Funeral March" of her own composition. She attended school at Greenwich Academy, and later recalled that at age 15 she "had to be excused from the painful experience of dissecting a cat in biology class".

== Career as Latinist ==
Holzworth majored in Latin at Bryn Mawr College in 1936. As a senior in 1935, she won a national competition organized by the University of Cincinnati to commemorate the 2000th anniversary of the birth of the Roman poet Horace, receiving the $1000 prize by unanimous decision of the judges. The competition required entrants to translate poetry by Horace, write an essay on "Horace and Augustus", and compose an original Latin poem in the manner of Horace. Holzworth's Latin poem was written during Benito Mussolini's preparations for the Italian invasion of Ethiopia and commented on his efforts at conquest. The competition rules required each entrant to submit under a pseudonym; Holzworth used the name "John Michael" and the judges assumed she was a man. The Latin poem and two of Holzworth's translations were published in the Bryn Mawr Alumni Bulletin, and the poem was anthologized in a 2020 collection of Latin writings from the United States.

Using the prize money from the Horace competition, Holzworth decided to spend a year studying at the American Academy in Rome. She returned to Bryn Mawr to complete an M.A. and Ph.D. in Latin. Her 1940 doctoral thesis was titled An Unpublished Commentary on Ovid's Fasti by Arnulfus of Orléans. In a 1943 article building on her thesis, Holzworth studied how the 12th-century scholar Arnulfus made use of works by the ancient mythographer Hyginus, and argued that Arnulfus had access to a more reliably transmitted text of Hyginus' Fabulae than the only manuscript that survived to the modern era. Hyginus' editor H. J. Rose agreed this allowed at least one passage of the Fabulae to be reconstructed more accurately.

Holzworth taught at Mount Holyoke College in the early 1940s.

== Career in veterinary medicine ==
In 1943, one of Holzworth's favorite cats died of panleukopenia, a viral infection for which no vaccine was then available, prompting a renewal of her childhood interest in veterinary medicine. She took time off teaching to work as a ward attendant at the Speyer Memorial Animal Hospital in New York City, before entering the College of Veterinary Medicine at Cornell University. She later considered the timing of this career change fortunate for two reasons: she applied to veterinary school in the final year of World War II, when many potential competitors were still abroad; and feline medicine, her main interest, had recently become the focus of "serious research". She was the only woman in her Cornell graduating class of 1950. When making farm visits with her classmates, she typically left them to work on cattle while she sought out farm cats for vaccination and medical care.

In 1950 Holzworth became an intern at Angell Memorial Animal Hospital in Boston, Massachusetts. In 1951, she joined the permanent staff, and she would continue to practice at Angell until her retirement in 1986. Throughout her career, she specialized in the veterinary care of cats. Colleagues recalled her as the first to take on that role, at a time when dogs were a more popular animal.

Holzworth authored a number of important studies of feline disorders with her Angell colleagues, and she came to be recognized as a leading authority in the field. Donald F. Smith describes her as "the definitive expert in feline medicine of her generation and the most important promoter of veterinary care for cats since Dr. Louis Camuti". In 1963 she was the first to describe feline infectious peritonitis, a condition later recognized as caused by feline coronavirus infection. With Angell's Gus Thornton, she was responsible for the first formal documentation of hyperthyroidism in cats. She also wrote a case report of feline trichinosis; this was based on her own cat, according to her colleague Susan Cotter.

Early in her career, Holzworth set out to write a book on feline diseases, with an intended publication date of 1962. However, the proliferation of research in the field led to a new plan, in which she would edit a two-volume work featuring contributions by a range of specialists. In the end, only the first volume of Diseases of the Cat: Medicine & Surgery ever appeared, published in 1987 to a generally favorable reception. B. M. Bush, reviewing it in the British Veterinary Journal, said it would be "invaluable" for teachers and researchers and "surely a new 'classic' textbook", while regretting that it did not include more concise summaries of the material. The designation as a "classic" was endorsed by Donald F. Smith in a historical article published in 2011. Susan Bunch, a former Angell intern, noted the presence in many chapters of "editor's comments that reflect Dr. Holzworth's personal experience and opinions".

Holzworth was a charter member of the Specialty of Internal Medicine within the American College of Veterinary Internal Medicine. She encouraged Fred W. Scott to set up the Feline Health Center at Cornell and served on its advisory council. She received a number of awards from professional organizations.

== Personal life ==
Holzworth was an enthusiast of art and opera.

== Retirement and death ==
After retiring in 1986, Holzworth moved to Lake Waramaug in Connecticut, near her childhood farm. She died at home on January 13, 2007. She left a bequest of approximately $2.8 million to the Cornell Feline Health Center, along with most of her collection of books and papers on cats.
