= Joseph Marshall Wade =

British-American ornithological and textile publisher

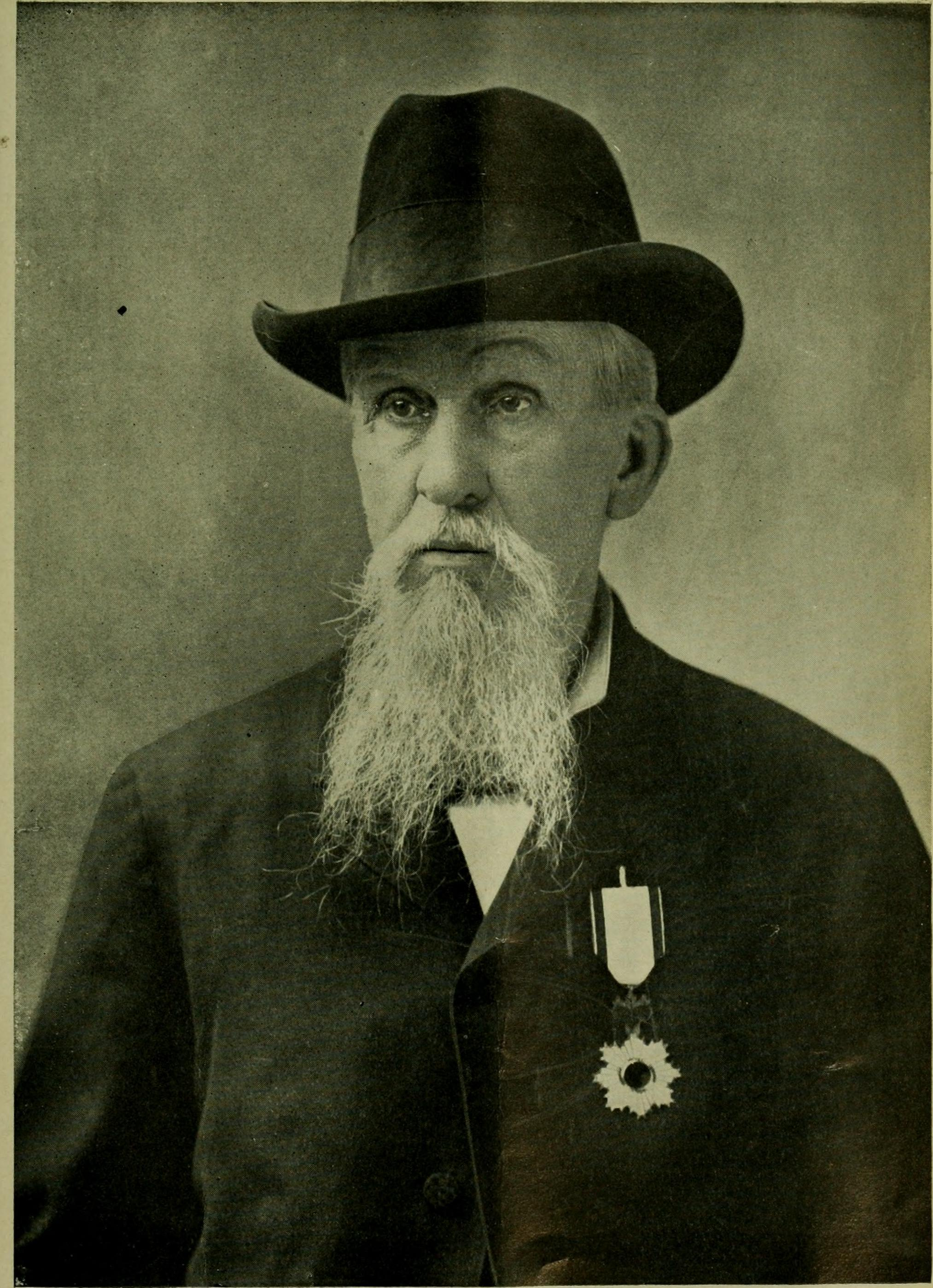
J.M. Wade

Joseph Marshall Wade (March 7, 1832 – January 22, 1905) was an important British-American ornithological and textile publisher in the late 19th century.

== Biography ==
Joseph Marshall Wade was born in New Wortley, near Leeds, England on March 7, 1832. In October 1850, Wade and his parents moved to the United States. By 1864, he was a successful expert weaver. However, natural history and publishing were his primary interests.

In 1873, Wade's first publication venture was the Fanciers' Journal, which dealt primarily with poultry and pets, but slowly included ornithological entries. His interests shifted to ornithology, and his second publication effort was more ambitious and successful. His journal The Ornithologist and Oologist, established in 1875, became a leading popular ornithological publication, often at odds with the more scholarly journals, such as The Bulletin of the Nuttall Ornithological Club and with professional birders of the American Ornithologists' Union (AOU).

His publication by 1883 influenced the founders of the American Ornithologists' Union to elect him as an associate member, which ranked below an active member. This led to a brief tussle between Wade and the leaders of the AOU. Montague Chamberlain warned that Wade, in combination with others who were upset with associate membership, such as Charles Johnson Maynard and Henry Minot, might work together to establish a rival ornithological union. Chamberlain attempted to purchase Wade's ornithological paper, while the leaders of the AOU offered Wade, Maynard and others active membership. Wade turned down these offers. Ultimately, Wade sold his journal to Frank Blake Webster in 1884, and more or less departed from American ornithology.

Wade was elected president of the New England Anti-Vivisection Society in 1899, succeeding Philip G. Peabody.

His other less known publications that he edited or created were Familiar Science, Truths of Nature, Journal of Commerce of Boston, Massachusetts, and the textile journals Fibre and Fabric and Textile Manufacturer in Dry Goods Bulletin. He also had an interest in Japanese culture and in the occult, and published short-lived magazines Occultism and Light from the Far East for these reasons. He died on January 22, 1905, in Boston, Massachusetts.
