= George Thorndike Angell Memorial =

Monument in Boston, Massachusetts, U.S.

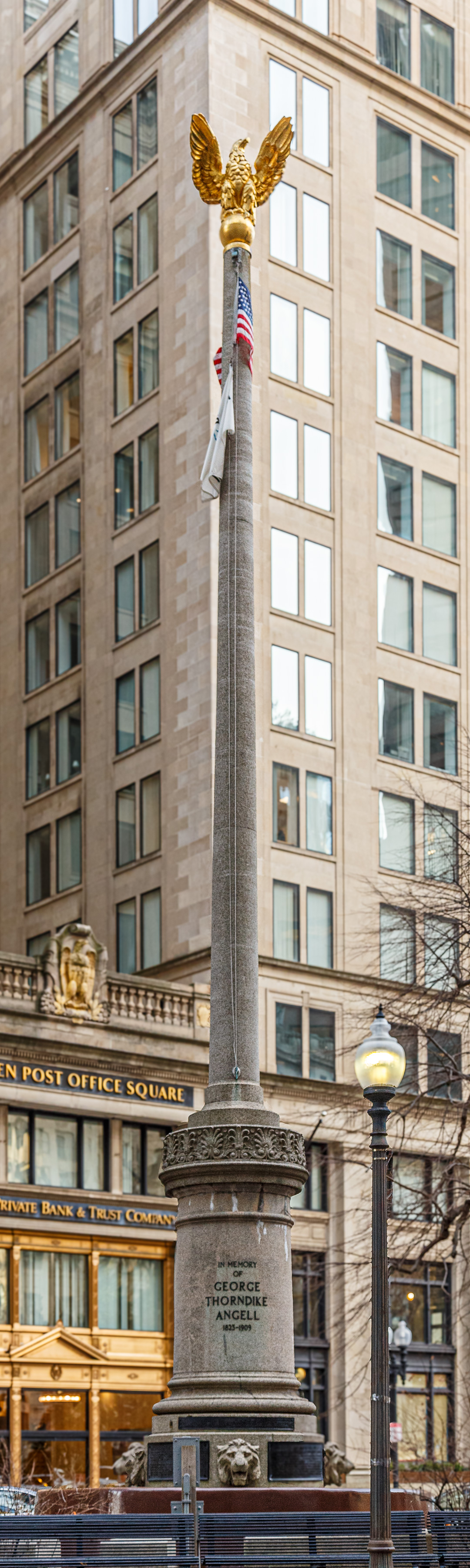
- 2024
- Alternative names: Angell Memorial Fountain; George Thorndike Angell Memorial Horse Fountain

General information
- Location: Boston, Massachusetts, United States
- Coordinates: 42°21′25.7″N 71°3′22.1″W
- Completed: 1912

Height
- Height: 60 feet

Technical details
- Material: Terrazzo, Gilded copper, Steel

Design and construction
- Architect: Peabody and Stearns

The George Thorndike Angell Memorial (sometimes called Angell Memorial Fountain or George Thorndike Angell Memorial Horse Fountain) is a monument commemorating George Thorndike Angell in Post Office Square in Boston, Massachusetts.

== Description and history ==
The fountain and 7,500 square foot plaza were designed by the firm of Peabody & Stearns in 1912.

The work was surveyed by the Smithsonian Institution's "Save Outdoor Sculpture!" program in 1997.

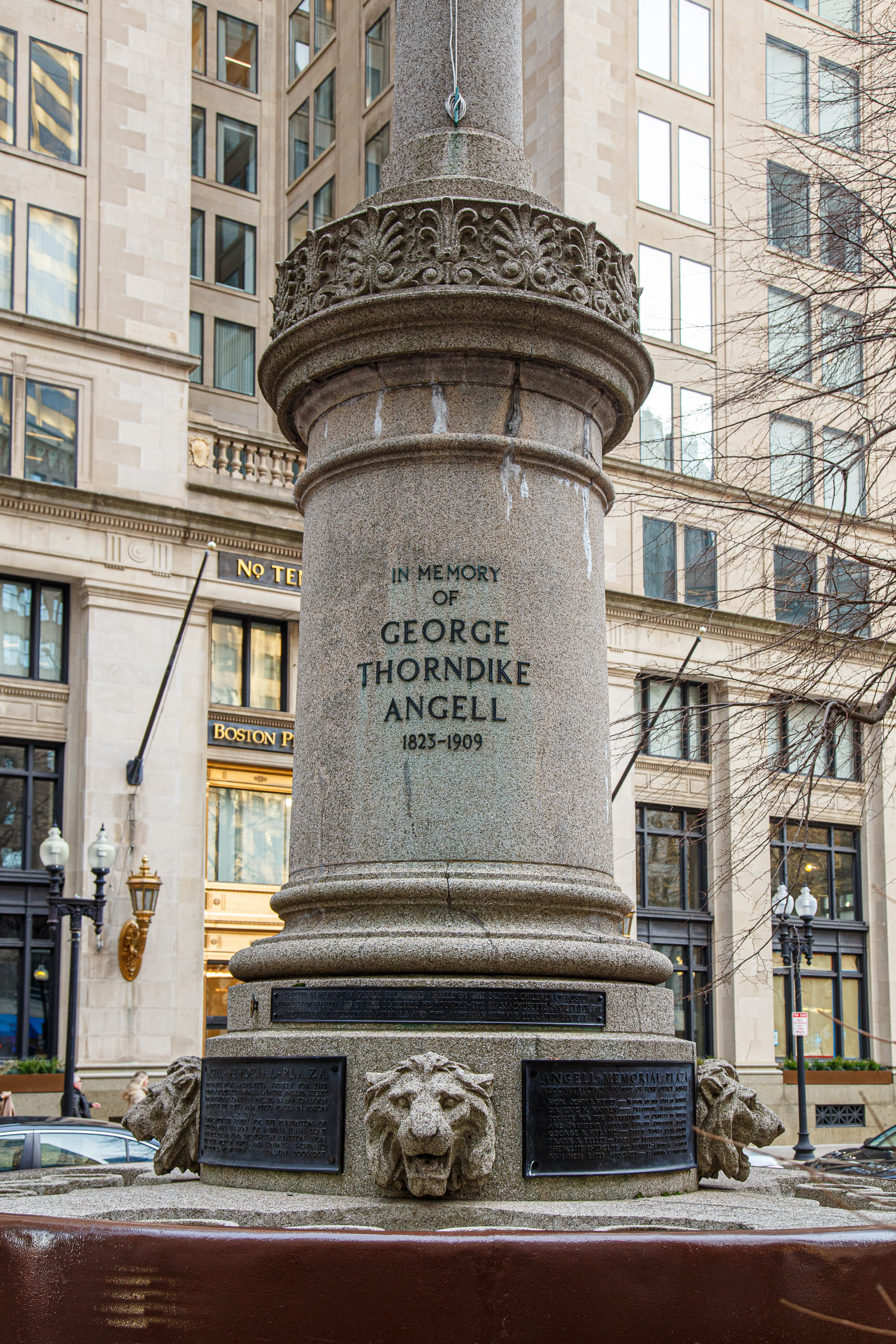
Detail
