= Our Dumb Animals =

American animal welfare magazine (1868–1970)

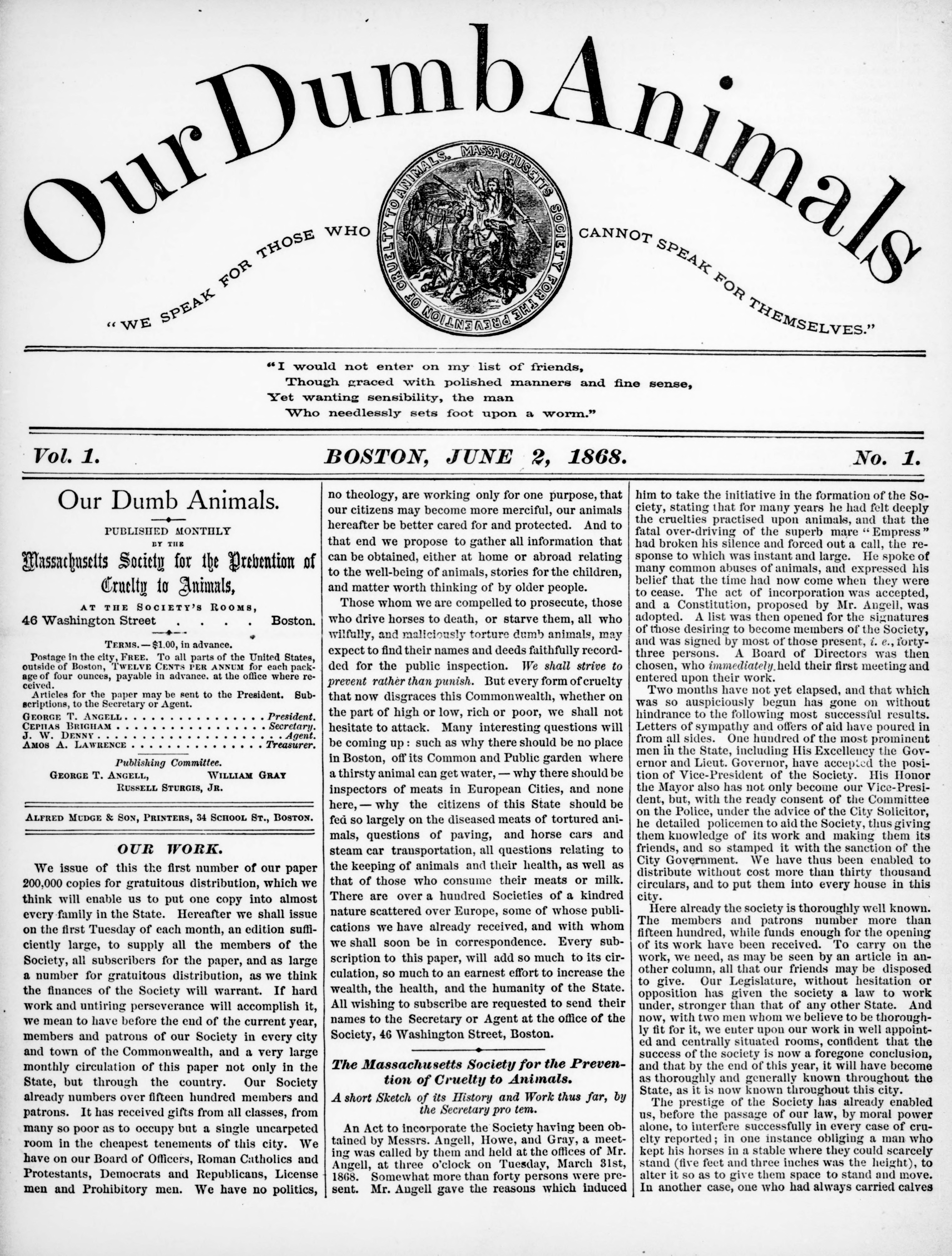
- Front page of the first issue (June 2, 1868)
- Editor: George T. Angell (1868–1909); Guy Richardson (1909–1943); William A. Swallow (1943–1968)
- Categories: Animal welfare
- Frequency: Monthly
- Publisher: Massachusetts Society for the Prevention of Cruelty to Animals; American Humane Education Society; Band of Mercy of America
- Founder: George T. Angell
- First issue: June 2, 1868
- Final issue Number: March 1970; Vol. 103, No. 3
- Country: United States
- Based in: Boston, Massachusetts, United States
- Language: English
- ISSN: 0275-2476
- OCLC: 977896424

Our Dumb Animals was an American monthly animal welfare magazine published in Boston, Massachusetts, from 1868 to 1970. Founded by George T. Angell as the magazine of the Massachusetts Society for the Prevention of Cruelty to Animals (MSPCA), it reported on animal cruelty, animal protection legislation and the activities of humane societies. It also published essays, fiction and illustrations promoting humane education, including a regular "Children's Department".

Angell edited the magazine until his death in 1909, after which it was edited by Guy Richardson and William A. Swallow. It ceased publication in March 1970 and was succeeded by a magazine titled Animals. The exhibition Be Kind: A Visual History of Humane Education identifies Our Dumb Animals as the first magazine in the United States devoted to animal welfare and kindness toward animals.

== History ==
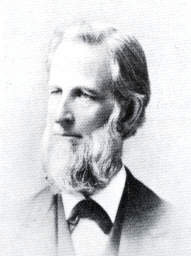
George T. Angell, founder and first editor of Our Dumb Animals

Our Dumb Animals was founded in 1868 by George T. Angell, a Boston lawyer and animal welfare advocate. In February of that year, Angell read about two horses that had been raced to death and published a letter protesting their treatment. Influenced by the work of Henry Bergh, founder of the American Society for the Prevention of Cruelty to Animals in New York, Angell established the MSPCA and began publishing Our Dumb Animals as its official magazine.

The first issue appeared on June 2, 1868, with an annual subscription price of $1, payable in advance. More than 200,000 copies of the first issue were distributed, including 25,000 by Boston police officers. Complimentary copies were also sent to newspaper editors, legislators, clergy and teachers.

The magazine was published monthly by the MSPCA. In later years, it was also issued by the American Humane Education Society and the Band of Mercy of America. Angell used the magazine to publicize the work of the MSPCA and promote humane education. He also helped establish thousands of Bands of Mercy in the United States and abroad, encouraging children to pledge kindness toward animals. By the time of his death in 1909, he was known as "the friend of animals".

After Angell's death, Guy Richardson became editor of Our Dumb Animals. Richardson also served as secretary of the MSPCA. He retired in 1943 and was succeeded by William A. Swallow. Between 1943 and 1968, Swallow held positions as vice president, secretary and board member of the MSPCA, the American Humane Education Society and the Angell Memorial Animal Hospital in Boston.

The final issue of Our Dumb Animals, volume 103, number 3, was published in March 1970. It was succeeded in May 1970 by Animals, a bimonthly magazine.

== Content ==
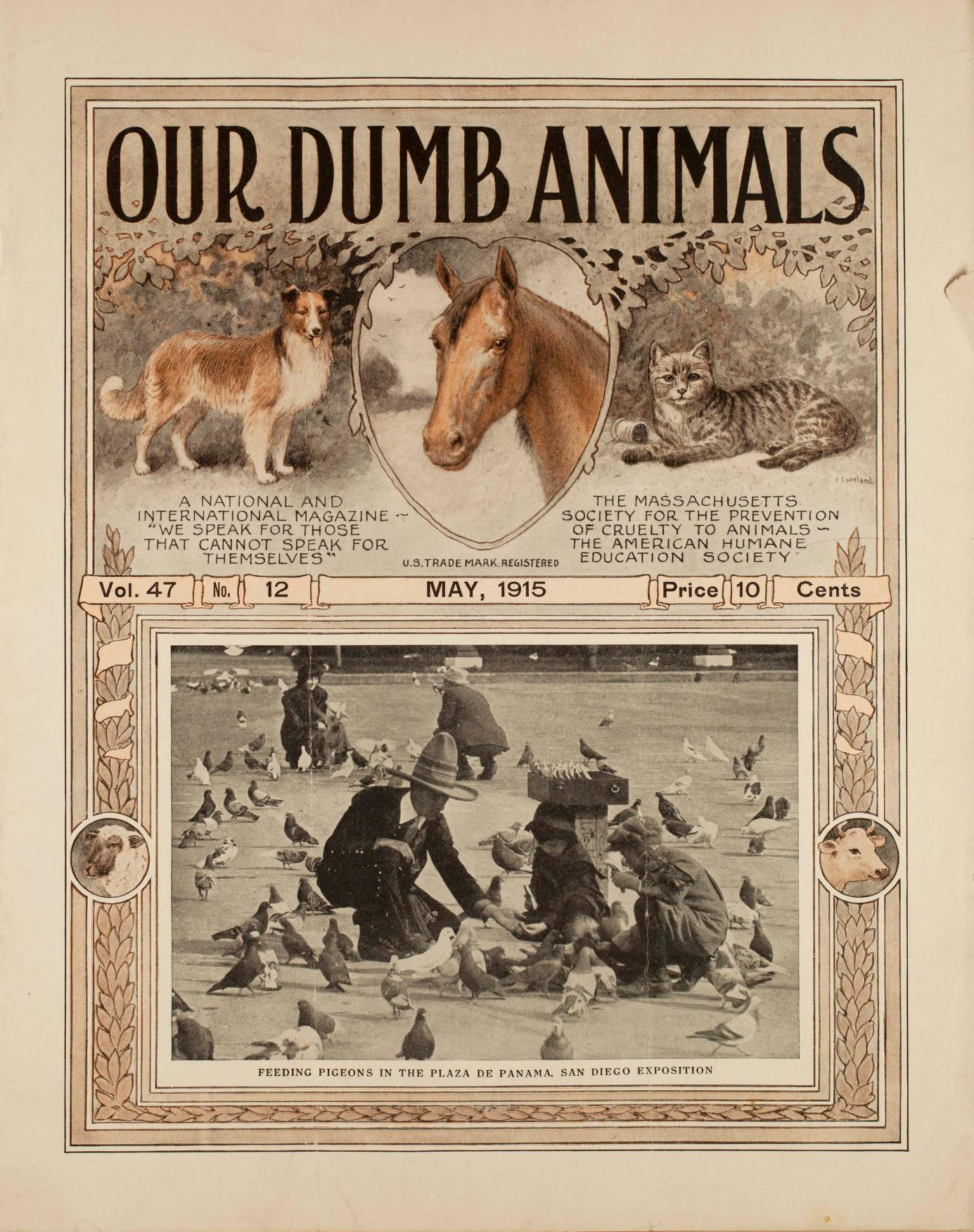
Cover of Our Dumb Animals (May 1915)

The word "dumb" in the magazine's title referred to animals' inability to speak, rather than a lack of intelligence. Its covers carried the motto "We Speak For Those Who Cannot Speak For Themselves".

Our Dumb Animals published reports on the MSPCA's activities, its members and proposed animal protection legislation. It also printed accounts of cruelty toward animals alongside stories describing animals' intelligence, loyalty and other qualities, often contrasting their behavior with that of humans.

Humane education was a recurring subject. The magazine published essays and fictional animal morality tales, while its "Children's Department" featured stories and illustrations encouraging kindness toward animals. It also reproduced animal paintings by artists including Edwin Landseer and Rosa Bonheur, and published photographs documenting animal welfare activities.

The National Museum of Animals & Society included Our Dumb Animals in its exhibition Be Kind: A Visual History of Humane Education. The exhibition described the magazine as the first American periodical devoted to animal welfare and credited it with inspiring similar publications. It also examined the magazine's use of illustrations and educational material to promote humane treatment of animals.
