= John T. Codman =

American dentist and writer

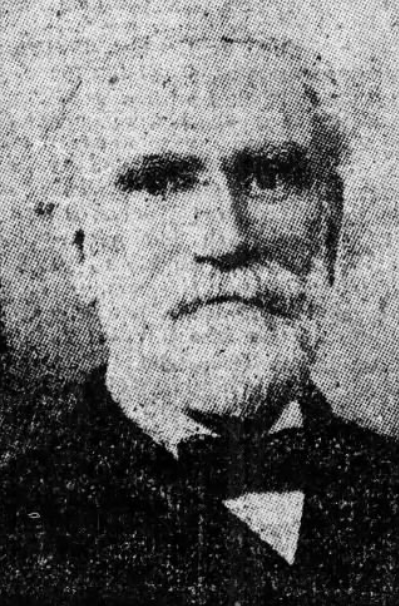
- Born: John Thomas Codman; 30 October 1826; Beacon Hill, Boston
- Died: 14 December 1907 (aged 81); Revere, Massachusetts
- Occupation: Dentist
- Spouse: Kezzie Hinckley Clark (m. 1859)

John Thomas Codman (30 October 1826 – 14 December 1907) was an American dentist and writer. He was educated at Brook Farm and was the first to receive the degree of Doctor of Dental Medicine.

== Career ==
Codman was born in Beacon Hill, Boston. A the age of seventeen he went to Brook Farm where he spent three years. At the farm he came into contact with George Ripley, George William Curtis, Nathaniel Hawthorne, Charles Anderson Dana and Ralph Waldo Emerson. After the farm dissolved he started his professional career as a dentist in Boston. He was associated with Albert T. Emery at Temple Place in Boston in the early 1850s and in 1863 worked for Nathan Cooley Keep a dental pioneer of New England. In 1869 he entered Harvard Dental School where he graduated with the degree of Doctor of Dental Medicine (DMD). He was the first to receive the degree of DMD, the title had been invented by Oliver Wendell Holmes.

He became Dean of Harvard Dental School. In 1879, he was appointed an instructor in operative dentistry at Harvard University, a position he held until 1881.

He authored articles for the Boston Daily Globe and the Massachusetts Dental Society. He became a member of the Massachusetts Dental Society in 1864 and continued membership until 1895 when he was made Honorary. He was Secretary from 1867 to 1868, Treasurer 1866 to 1887 and was selected as President in 1875. He was a member of the American Academy of Dental Science from 1870 to 1893.

In 1894, he authored his best known work Brook Farm: Historic and Personal Memoirs. Codman was an opponent of vivisection. He was president of the New England Anti-Vivisection Society from 1901 to 1904.

== Personal life ==
Codman identified as a transcendentalist. Codman is alleged to have become a vegetarian at Brook Farm and to have followed the diet for over forty years. However he admitted in 1900 that he occasionally ate meat.

Codman married Kezzie Hinckley Clark on 13 December 1859. His sons were Benjamin H. Codman, Charles T. Codman and John C. Codman. Benjamin H. Codman succeeded his dental practice.

He died in Revere, Massachusetts on 14 December 1907. His funeral was held at Cedar Grove cemetery in Dorchester.

== Selected publications ==
- Brook Farm: Historic and Personal Memoirs. Arena Publishing Company. 1894.
