= Humane society =

Group that aims to stop human or animal suffering due to cruelty or other reasons

A humane society is a group that aims to stop cruelty to animals. In many countries, the term is used mostly for societies for the prevention of cruelty to animals (SPCA). In the United Kingdom, and historically in the United States, such societies provide waterway rescue, prevention and recovery services, or may give awards for saving human life (e.g., Glasgow Humane Society and Massachusetts Humane Society).

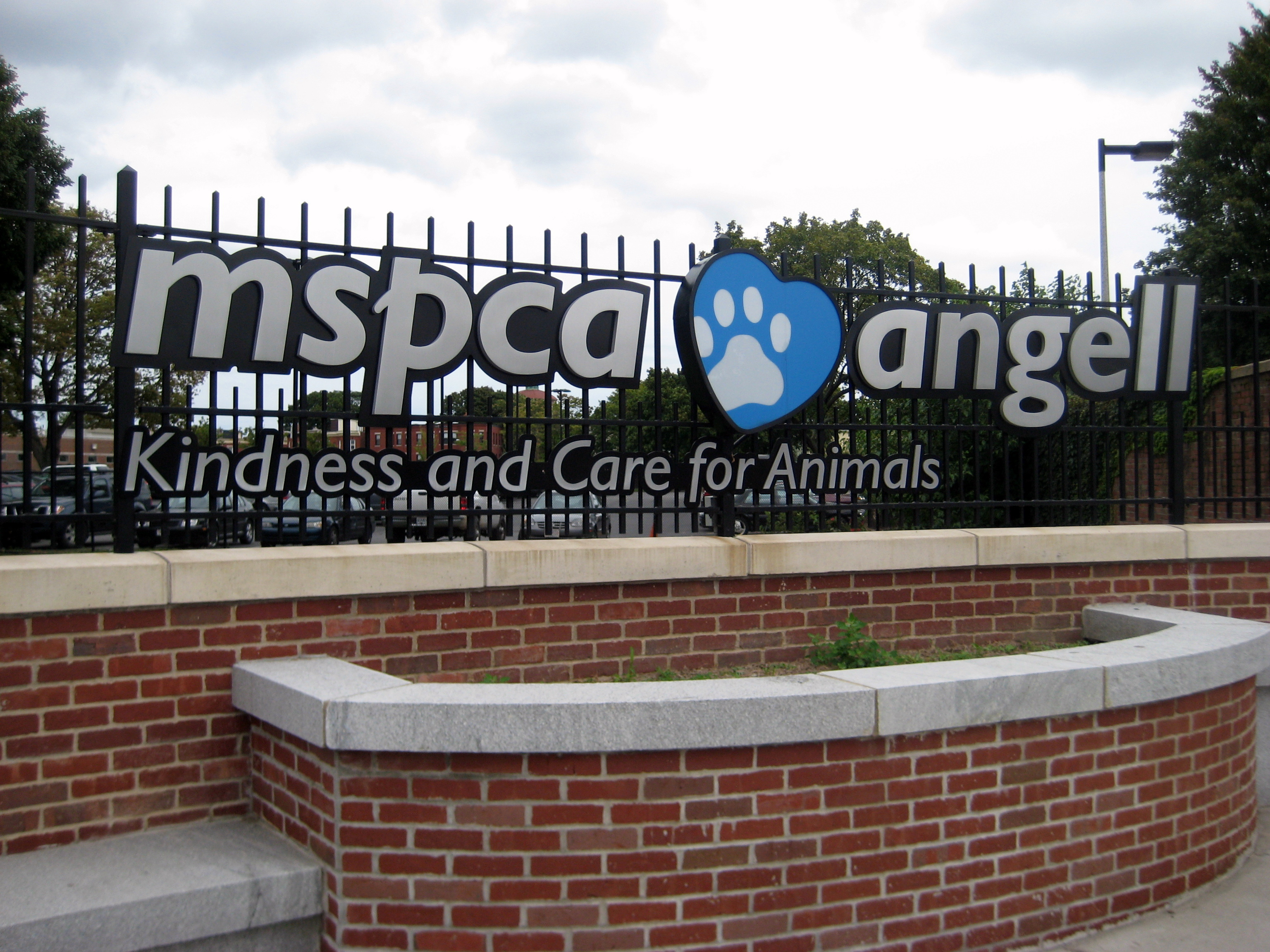
MSPCA-Angell in Boston, Massachusetts, was founded in 1868 and is the second-oldest humane society in the United States

== Australia ==
The first Society for the Prevention of Cruelty to Animals (SPCA), based on the British Royal Society for the Prevention of Cruelty to Animals (RSPCA), was set up in Victoria in 1871. This was followed by New South Wales in 1873; South Australia in 1875; Tasmania in 1878; Queensland in 1883; Western Australia in 1892; Australian Capital Territory in 1955 and Darwin in 1965. The Royal Warrant was given to the WA SPCA in 1920, followed by NSW SPCA in 1923, South Australia in 1937, Queensland in 1955, Tasmania in 1956 and Victoria in 1956.

The national organisation, RSPCA Australia, was formed in 1981 to give a national voice on policy matters and advise the federal government on animal welfare issues.

== Canada ==
The first SPCA in Canada was the Canadian SPCA founded in Montreal in 1869. The other societies developed on a regional basis and now 123 societies are represented at a federal level by Humane Canada, formerly named the Canadian Federation of Humane Societies.

== New Zealand ==
Early British settlers brought with them the laws of England, and the British Cruelty to Animals Act 1835 was adopted by New Zealand. This was replaced by New Zealand's own Protection of Animals Act in 1878, and the first SPCA was formed in Dunedin in 1882 quickly followed by other societies. In 1933, all the societies amalgamated as a federation and this grew into the present day's Royal New Zealand Society for the Prevention of Cruelty to Animals.

The Humane Society of New Zealand was established as a registered charity in 1975.

== United Kingdom ==
The first humane societies were founded in the United Kingdom. They included the Royal Humane Society in 1774, the Glasgow Humane Society in 1790, and the Royal Society for the Prevention of Cruelty to Animals (RSPCA) in 1824.

The Royal Humane Society is a charity that grants awards for acts of bravery in the saving of human lives, and for the restoration of life by resuscitation. Since its foundation, the society has given more than 85,000 awards. The Glasgow Humane Society is a prevention, rescue, and recovery group set up to cover the waterways of Greater Glasgow, Scotland.

The main animal humane societies in the UK are the RSPCA and its offshoots, the Scottish Society for the Prevention of Cruelty to Animals (SSPCA) and the Ulster Society for the Prevention of Cruelty to Animals (USPCA). There is also the People's Dispensary for Sick Animals (PDSA), founded in 1917, to treat the sick and injured animals of the poor, and numerous other animal rescue charities for wildlife, working animals, and domestic pets.

== United States ==
The first SPCA in the United States was the American Society for the Prevention of Cruelty to Animals (ASPCA), founded by Henry Bergh in New York City in 1866. Two years later, the Massachusetts Society for the Prevention of Cruelty to Animals was founded in Boston by a group that included George Thorndike Angell, John Quincy Adams II, Ralph Waldo Emerson, Henry Saltonstall, and William Gordon Weld. Examples of other national, nonsheltering humane animal societies include: American Humane Association, which was founded in 1877 as a network of local organizations to prevent cruelty to children and animals. The Humane Society of the United States (HSUS) was established in 1954.

=== National vs. local humane societies ===
Humane societies in the U.S. are independent of similarly named national organizations such as the HSUS or ASPCA. While local organizations are concerned primarily with sheltering, adoption, and euthanasia of animals, these national organizations coordinate and address broader issues beyond the scope or resources of the smaller, independent groups.

The HSUS does not operate, control, or fund local humane societies. It does provide support through grants, training of animal care personnel, standards of care, and evaluation services. The HSUS frequently works with shelters in disaster operations and large-scale animal rescues, assisting in the evaluation, triage, handling, transport and care of rescued animals. The HSUS maintains the animalsheltering.com website for animal care professionals, and publishes a bi-monthly magazine, Animal Sheltering to which 12,300 shelters and rescue groups subscribe.

The HSUS provides national promotion of shelters and animal adoptions, alone or in partnership with other animal protection charities. The Shelter Pet Project is a joint venture of the HSUS, Maddie's Fund, and the Ad Council to promote awareness of shelters and encourage adoptions.

== See also ==
- Animal shelter
- Animal welfare
