= Frank Blake Webster =

American publisher

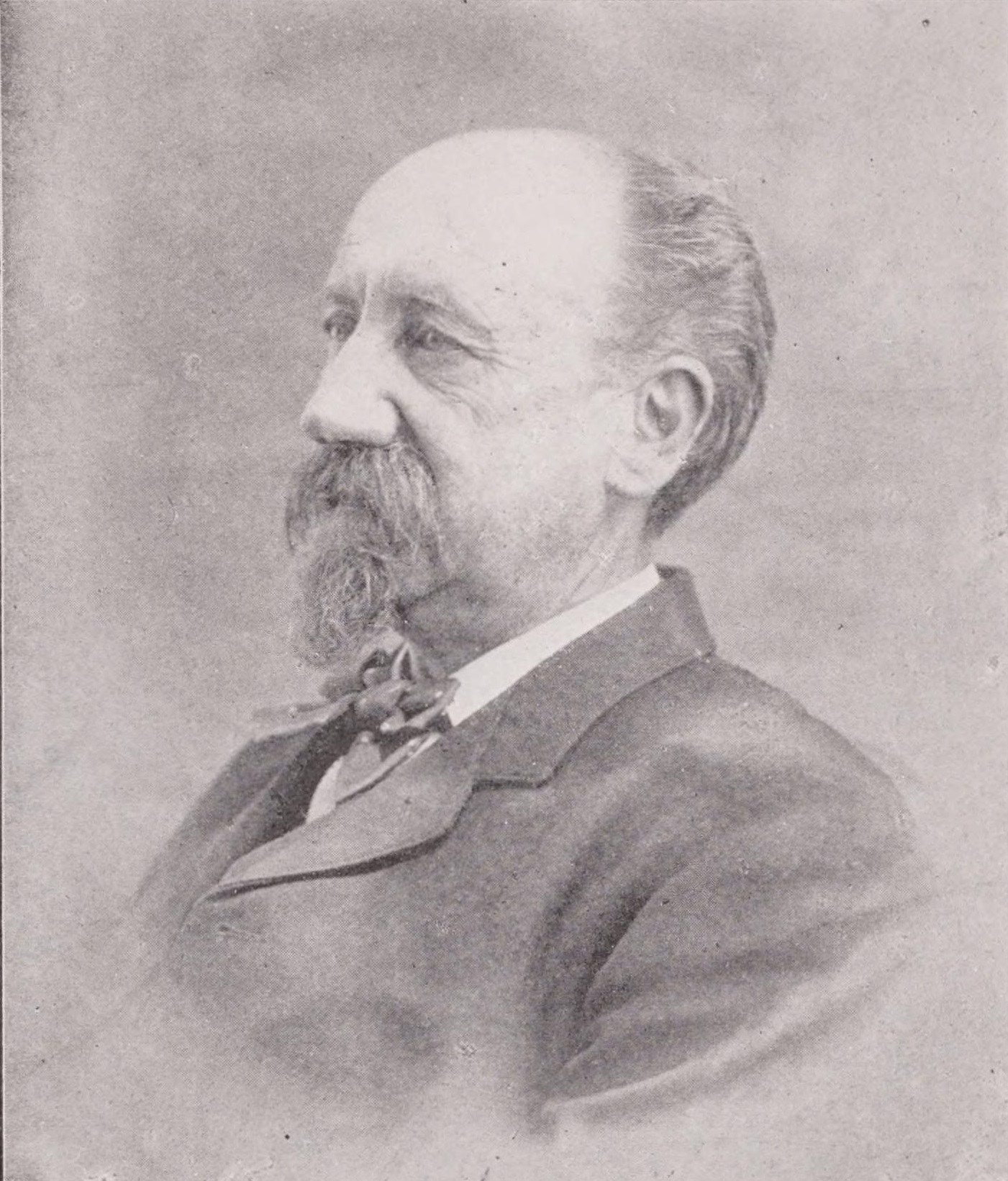

Frank Blake Webster (June 16, 1850–November 6, 1922) was an influential ornithological publisher, taxidermist and natural history dealer in the late 19th century.

== Biography ==
Frank Blake Webster was born in Pawtucket, Rhode Island, on June 16, 1850. He graduated from the Highland Military Academy at Worcester, Massachusetts, in 1867. Following this, he worked as a clerical worker, but he studied ornithology, taxidermy, and collected natural history specimen in the afternoons and evening. By 1874, the collecting of specimen of natural history became so popular that a naturalists' supply depot was opened in Pawtucket under the name A. L. Ellis & Co. with Webster as a leading member of the company.

In 1884, Webster quit his clerical work to focus on natural history full time, including the dealing of specimen. He bought the well-known Ornithologist and Oologist from publisher Joseph Marshall Wade, where it became the popular counterpart to the more scientific Auk, published by the American Ornithologists' Union. The journal folded during the Panic of 1893.

In 1888, Webster erected his Museum and Naturalists' Supply Depot in Hyde Park, Massachusetts. The following year, in Boston, Massachusetts, Webster and several ornithologists inaugurated the short-lived League of Massachusetts Ornithologists with Webster as president and Charles Johnson Maynard as vice president, as a populist rival to the purely scientific ornithologists in the state.

In 1897, Walter Rothschild, 2nd Baron Rothschild approached Webster to organize a collecting trip on the Galapagos Islands. Webster gathered taxidermists and naturalists, including Rollo Beck, to collect Galápagos tortoises and land birds. Webster, however, would stay in the States, but the expedition is still called the Webster-Harris expedition by scholars. However, Webster's group discovered the flightless cormorant, which Rothschild named after taxidermist Charles Miller Harris, a member of the expedition.

Webster died November 6, 1922, in Hyde Park, Massachusetts.
