= Humane education =

Education in compassion for living beings

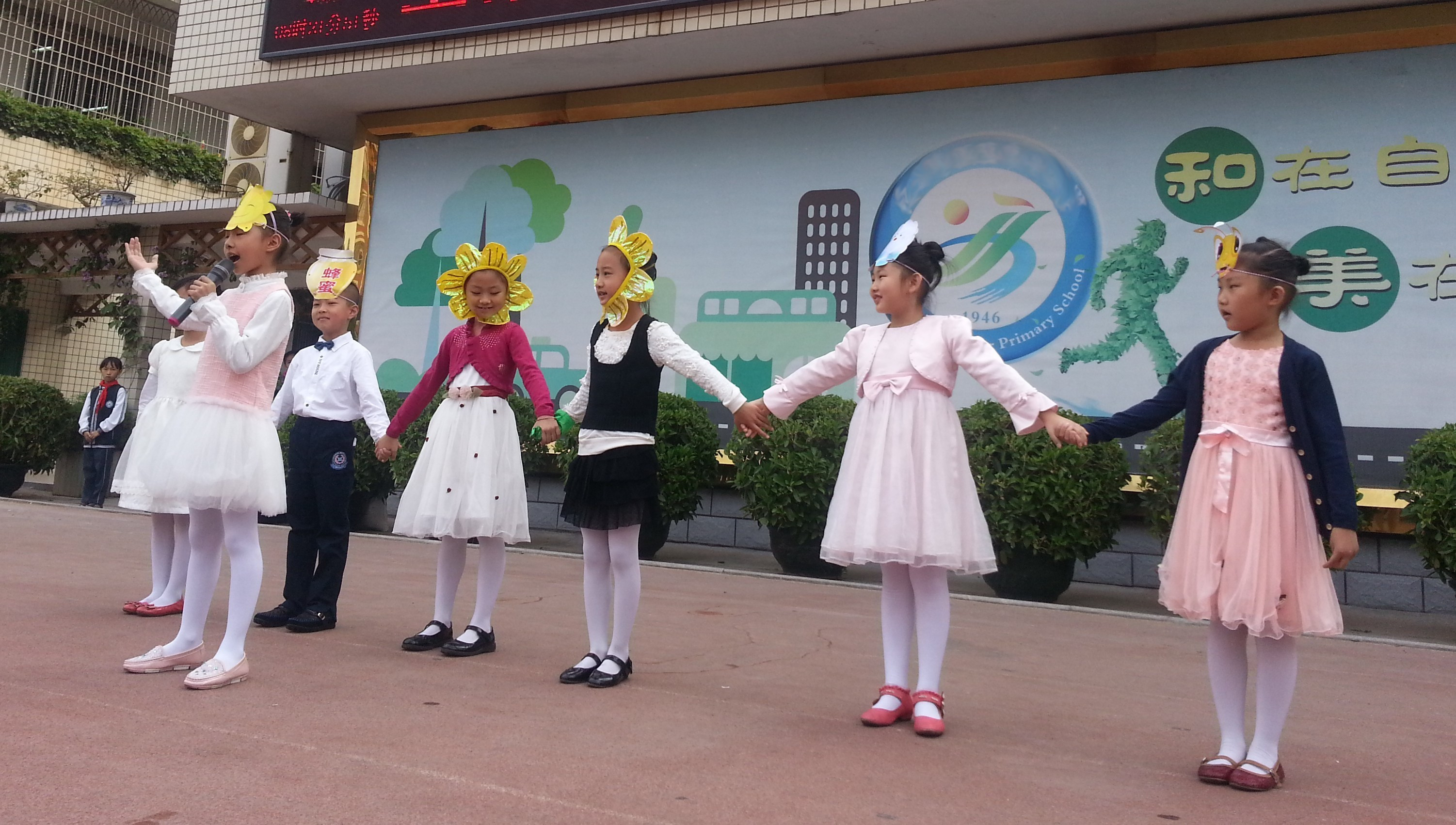
Humane education performance by elementary school students in China

Humane education is broadly defined as education that nurtures compassion and respect for living beings. In addition to focusing on the humane treatment of non-human animals, humane education also increasingly contains content related to the environment, the compassionate treatment of other people, and the interconnectedness of issues pertaining to people and the planet. Humane education encourages cognitive, affective, and behavioral growth through personal development of critical thinking, problem solving, perspective-taking, and empathy as it relates to people, animals, the planet, and the intersections among them. Education taught through the lens of humane pedagogy supports more than knowledge acquisition, it allows learners to process personal values and choose prosocial behaviors aligned with those values.

== History ==
Humane education as a discrete field of education was created in the late 1800s by individuals like George Angell as an attempt to address social injustices and prevent cruelty to animals before it started along with the formation of SPCAs, such as the Massachusetts SCPA and the ASPCA. The formation of humane education and animal protection/welfare organizations was associated with the expansion of women's suffrage and the temperance movement, and many of those involved in creation and early advocacy of humane education also worked in those other areas of social change as well. These early activists successfully advocated for the passage of laws supporting or even requiring the teaching of humane education in schools, and many teachers did teach it. The animal welfare organizations also visited schools and other youth centers to teach "push-in" programs that supplemented—and possibly augmented—the children's other education.

In addition to school-based programs and activities, humane education was also initially conducted through Bands of Mercy; although these have been disbanded, humane education continues to be conducted in community-based settings. These include animal shelters, humane education centers and parks as well as, e.g., Boys and Girls Clubs, YWCAs and YMCAs, cultural and religious centers, etc.

Currently, humane education is often conducted by animal welfare organizations and organizations that include humane education among their primary focuses.

== General Goals, Content, and Pedagogical Strategies ==
Humane education seeks to nurture the development of compassion and concern that people—especially children and adolescents—have towards one group (e.g., humans) be extended to other groups (e.g., animals). One of the beliefs that helped establish humane education as a field has been that helping children learn to treat animals with kindness will encourage them to grow up to be adults who are kind to all animals, human and non-human. This "cross-fertilization" of kindness is also used, e.g., to try to have the care that children have for their own pets be extended to animals in their community, animals in circuses and zoos, animals in agriculture and on factory farms, or to show how reducing pollution in one's neighborhood can help ecosystems far away.

=== Typical Current Content ===
In addition to the humane treatment of domestic animals, humane education now often examines broader issues including human relationships and animal exploitation. Common topics currently covered include responsible pet care (e.g., spaying/neutering and responsible adoption); animal agriculture; factory farming; captive wild animals; understanding animal emotions, sentience, and communication; blood sports; bite prevention; ecological stewardship; the interconnectedness of life; pollution; reduction/reuse/recycling of materials; bullying; non-violent conflict resolution; critical thinking, child labor; and the effects of every-day activities on other people, animals, and the environment.

=== Pedagogical Strategies ===
Since the beginning, humane education has focused on a constructivist approach to teaching and includes methods such as service-learning and experiential learning. Organizations that conduct humane education programs, therefore, often create community- or home-based activities in which students can learn humane education content and behaviors through experience and reflection.

Humane education programs may be conducted in a variety of ways in schools. Programs may be supplemental or add-on programs such as when a humane educator or the teacher of record will devote a class period to humane education content; in these cases, the lesson is often devoted wholly to teach humane education content (e.g., responsible pet or environmental care, spaying/neutering, respect for others). Programs may also be infused into the curriculum or add-ins. These infused programs allow for the most effective form of Humane Pedagogy (a teaching approach inspired by critical pedagogy, which attempts to help students activate cognitive, affective, and psychomotor domains of learning and determine personal values with an ecocentric lens.) The strongest humane pedagogy is part of both the written and unwritten curriculum.

Humane education may also be integrated into traditional lessons. Since most children and adolescents find animals and nature to be engaging topics, humane education can be an effective vehicle to also teach other content, such as literature, history, civics, or science.

== Effectiveness ==
Although teachers who use humane education often report anecdotal evidence that it works, and although there is a welter of qualitative research that also suggests it is effective, there are few objective, well-controlled studies that compare humane education programs against good control groups. Nonetheless, those who have studied it carefully tend to find that it is effective---probably at least as effective as other, comparable non-humane education programs.

=== Animal-Assisted Education ===
Animal-assisted education is education that is employs direct interaction/perception of animals to enhance learning. One such program used shelter dogs in a school-based violence prevention and character education program. According to the researcher, "[f]indings indicate that receiving the program significantly alters students' normative beliefs about aggression, levels of empathy, and displays of violent and aggressive behaviors".

=== School-based Programs ===
Probably the largest study of humane education ever conducted included a "large evaluation conducted over 3 separate years in 25 public elementary schools in 5 cities across eastern China". The author randomly assigned about half of the schools to participate in Caring-for-Life, a humane education program, and randomly assigned the other half to the control group. In all, the effect of the program was tested on over 2,000 first and second grade students. The author reports that "[s]tudents who participated in the program displayed significantly greater gains in prosociality than similar students who didn't. Students who participated in an expanded version of the program appeared to realize even greater gains".

Another large-scale, randomized control trial found that a 12-lesson humane education program significantly improved lower elementary students' attitudes and behaviors about the environment. The humane education program was taught by the students' teachers during one period of the normal school day over one academic year. By the end of the year, the children who participated in the program reported caring more about a range of environmental issues and that they engaged in more behaviors to address these issues (than did peers who did not participate in the humane education program). The humane education program that was studied was designed to address the United Nationals Educational, Scientific, and Cultural Organisation's (UNESCO's) Four Pillars of Education through both humane education strategies and content.

Another experimental-vs-control study compared the effect of the HEART humane education program on elementary students in several schools in two cities in the United States. Students self-reported their attitudes about the treatment of animals and the environment, and teachers rated each student's prosocial and disruptive behaviors. The authors found that "the development of prosocial behaviors and self-reported attitudes significantly interacted with group assignment: Students who participated in the humane education program showed stronger growth in both of these outcomes compared with students in the control group". However, they did not find changes in disruptive behaviors to differ between the groups. Overall, the authors state that "[t]he results support the effectiveness of a humane education program to teach a relatively large and diverse group of upper elementary students to learn about animal welfare issues and to improve their prosocial behaviors. Effects appeared strongest on attitudes; behavioral effects were found to be largely limited to behaviors directly addressed by the humane education program."

=== Duration of Effects ===
The effects of a humane education program seem to last for at least a year. Piek and colleagues found that young children randomly assigned to participate in the Animal Fun program, which "was designed to enhance motor and social development in young children" showed significant improvements in teacher-rated prosocial behaviour and total difficulties compared to children randomly assigned to the control group. The effect of the program was found to still be strong not only 6 months but also 12 and 18 months later. As the authors states, "The Animal Fun program appears to be effective in improving social and behavioural outcomes".

== See also ==
- Humane education advocates
- Humane education organizations
- Animal-assisted interventions
- Animal cruelty
- Animal welfare
- Ecopedagogy
- Environmental education
- Humanitarian education
- Social justice
- Sustainability
