= Jerry of the Islands =

1917 novel by Jack London

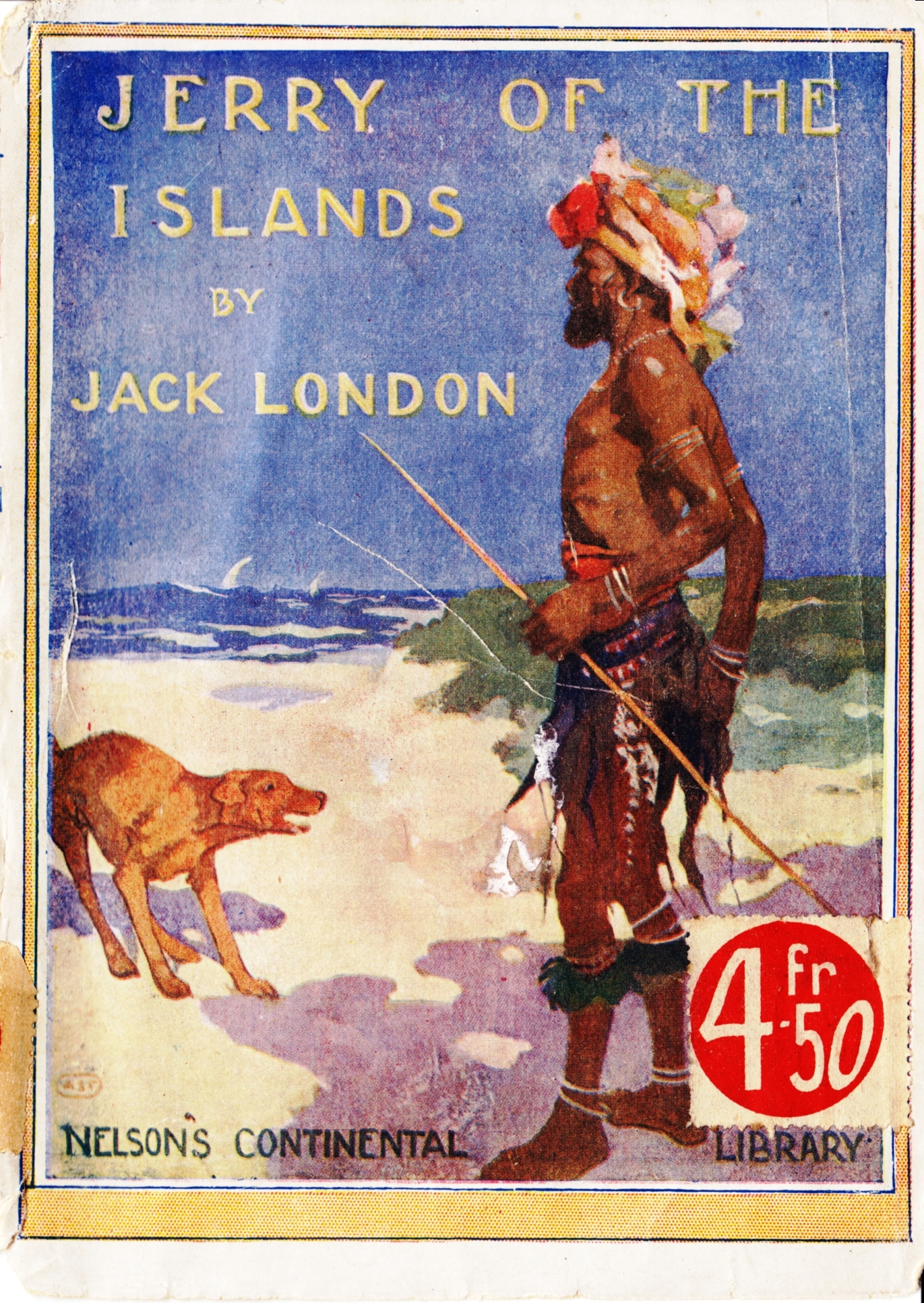
- Early edition cover
- Author: Jack London
- Language: English
- Genre: Fiction
- Publisher: The Macmillan Company
- Publication date: 1917
- Publication place: United States
- Media type: Print
- Pages: 348 pp
- ISBN: 978-1589635012 2002 edition
- Followed by: Michael, Brother of Jerry

Jerry of the Islands: A True Dog Story is a novel by American writer Jack London. Jerry of the Islands was initially published in 1917 and is one of the last works by Jack London. The novel is set on the island of Malaita, a part of the Solomon Islands archipelago, which in 1893 became a British protectorate. The hero of the novel is Irish Terrier Jerry, who was a brother of dog named Michael, about whom London wrote another novel—Michael, Brother of Jerry.

== Origin of the novel ==
In the preface, Jack London tells about the ship Minota on which he traveled and which wrecked in the Solomon Islands. Captain Kellar of Eugenie ship rescued Jack London after the shipwreck but later died by the hands of the cannibals. London mentions a letter that he received from C. M. Woodford, the Resident Commissioner of the British Solomons. In this letter, Woodford wrote about a punitive expedition on the neighboring island. The second aim of the operation was searching for the remains of Jack London's friends. During the voyage on Minota, Jack London and his wife found a dog aboard the ship, an Irish terrier named Peggy. The couple attached to Peggy so much that London's wife stole the dog after the wreck of the ship.

== Plot ==
Jerry was born in Santa Isabel Island, a part of the Solomon Islands archipelago. Jerry's owner was Mr. Haggin, who worked as a plantation guard and used Jerry to chase black slaves. Higgin gave Jerry to Mr. Van Horn, Captain of ship Arangi, under condition to return the dog if something bad happens. The ship was engaged in delivering so-called "reverse" slaves who worked for three years on a plantation. During a stop on Malaita island, Arangi was attacked by the natives, who killed the captain and skipper. Jerry was kicked from the ship, which was looted and burned. A native boy found Jerry in the sea and delivered the dog on the shore. Later, Jerry was brought to a village, where tribe chief Bashto decided to use Jerry for improving the breed of local dogs. Jerry received a taboo status and began to live among the tribesmen.

Jerry led a fairly quiet life until local sorcerer Agno decided to use the dog for a sacrifice. To overcome its taboo status, Agno arranged Jerry to attack a holy bird megapoda, which also had a taboo status. Jerry stole the bird eggs, which were kept for chief Bashta. Jerry was spotted while killing the fourth bird. The bird's taboo status was higher than that of Jerry; therefore, the dog could be sacrificed. However, old blindman Nalasu bought Jerry for a pig to protect himself against an expected vendetta.

Later, the village was destroyed by British as a part of punitive operation to retaliate for the loss of Arangi. Nalasu got killed; Jerry escaped and hid in the jungle. Having stayed there for a long time, Jerry began to look for people. Out in the beach, the dog saw a distant ship and plunged into the sea, thinking it is Arangi and hoping to see his beloved Captain Van Horn. The ship was the yacht Ariel traveling around the world. People on board noticed the dog and saved it.

One of the crewmen recognized the dog and announced that it is a dog of Mr. Haggin form Santa Isabel Island. Later, the yacht arrived at Tulagi harbor, where a commissioner who knew Mr. Haggin sent him a message. Mr. Haggin sailed to the island with dog Michael, who was the brother of Jerry. The brothers—Jerry and Michael—met each other just to be separated ten days later. Jerry stayed on the yacht Ariel with its owner, Villa, while Michael stayed on the island. They met each other once again several years later in California.
