= Philip G. Peabody =

American lawyer and anti-vivisection activist

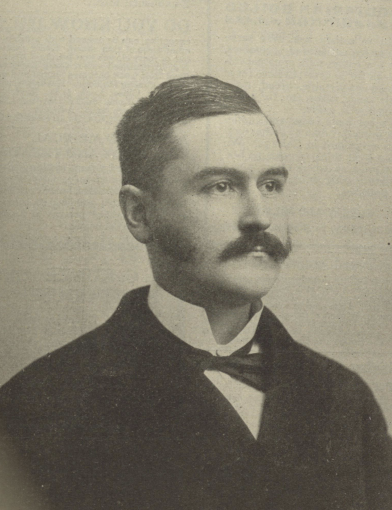
- Born: Philip Glendower Peabody; 22 February 1857; New York
- Died: 25 February 1934 (aged 77); Copenhagen
- Occupation: Lawyer
- Spouse: Mabel G. Peabody (m. 1879)

Philip Glendower Peabody (22 February 1857 – 25 February 1934) was an American lawyer and traveller known for his anti-vivisection activism. He was the co-founder and first president of the New England Anti-Vivisection Society.

== Career ==
Peabody graduated from Columbia College in 1877 and worked for a year at the First National Bank of New York. He left to study law and graduated from Columbia Law School in 1880 and was admitted to the New York Bar. Peabody met Robert G. Ingersoll in 1881 who wrote several prefaces for his anti-vivisection books. Peabody travelled with Ingersoll throughout the United States and travelled to Denmark, England, France, Germany, Italy, Ireland, Norway, Switzerland and many other countries. He is credited with having travelled over 65,000 miles in a single year and crossed the Atlantic ocean 145 times. He had made 52 trips on Scandinavian liners commanded by his friend, Captain Frederick Mecklenburg. He commented that Austria had the most beautiful women and that Denmark was the most civilized country.

In 1885, Peabody moved from New York to Boston. He had one of the largest private libraries in Boston in which he erected a building. In total owned around 10,000 books. He advocated for birth control and was treasurer of the National Scientific Family Culture Institute.

== Anti-vivisection ==
Peabody was a staunch opponent of vivisection believing it was cowardly, unethical and an altogether detestable crime. He was described as "one of the best informed exponents of vivisection in America; being widely known both in this country and Europe for his opposition to it".

In 1895, Peabody founded the New England Anti-Vivisection Society (NEAVS) with Joseph M. Greene. He was president of NEAVS from 1895 to 1898 and treasurer of the New York State Anti-Vivisection Society. Peabody resigned his presidency but also his position as chairman of the board of directors over a dispute with the directors. He was a life member of the Animal Defence and Anti-Vivisection Society.

Peabody was a vegetarian. He served on the board of directors of the National Vegetarian Society.

== Personal life ==
He was son of Charles A. Peabody, a prominent New York judge. His brothers were Charles A. Peabody Jr. and physician George L. Peabody. Peabody was an agnostic. He married Mabel G. Peabody in 1879. Their son Charles Livingston Peabody was born in 1880.

Peabody died in his sleep at the Central Hotel in Copenhagen on 25 February 1934. He requested for his body to be buried at sea without any religious ceremony. His estate worth more than $170,000 was divided between three parties.

== Selected publications ==
- Personal Experiences of Two American Anti-Vivisectionists in Various Countries. New England Anti-Vivisection Society. 1895.

== Gallery ==
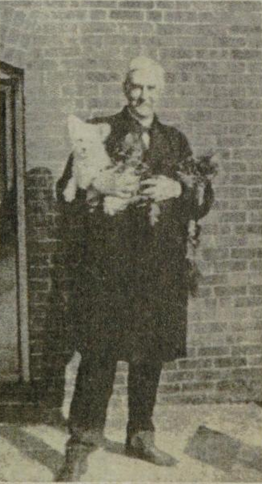
Philip G. Peabody in 1920
