= Josephine Wade =

American businesswoman and restaurant owner

Josephine Wade-Smith
- Born: Forrest City, Arkansas, U.S.
- Other names: Mother Wade
- Occupations: Chef; restaurateur; nonprofit administrator; mortgage broker
- Spouse: Rupert Smith
- Culinary career
- Cooking style: Soul food
- Current restaurant(s): Josephine's Cooking (1986–)

Josephine "Mother" Wade-Smith is an American chef and restaurateur. Wade opened Captain's Hard Times in Chatham neighborhood in Chicago in 1986, along with her partner. Wade created the recipes, many of which were based on family recipes for the soul food menu. The restaurant she founded is now named Josephine's Cooking and was featured on Restaurant: Impossible in 2019. A street in Chicago was named after her in 2017.

== Biography ==
Born in Forrest City, Arkansas, U.S., Wade grew up in poverty and her parents worked as sharecroppers. She graduated high school in Phoenix, Arizona, U.S.

In 1986, Wade and her husband, Rupert Smith, opened a restaurant called "Captain's Hard Times" in the Chatham neighborhood. The original idea was to name the restaurant "Josephine's", but she decided on a vacation to name the restaurant "hard times" instead after seeing the phrase printed on a matchbook. Captain was her partner's nickname. The restaurant featured "bayou decor" and Wade, the owner, served soul food. Wade created the recipes used in the restaurant, some of which were based on her own mother's recipes. Later, the restaurant was renamed to "Josephine's Cooking".

In addition to working in the restaurant, Wade is the head of a group, We Women Empowered, which works with young people. Wade also hired teenagers from the community to work in the restaurant. She also helped provide food and clothes for young people in the neighborhood. Wade also earned money as a mortgage broker. She worked to help elect Harold Washington as Mayor.

In 2017, Wade was honored by the city of Chicago in having a road named after her called "Mother Josephine Wade Way". The designation was presented on March 4 by Mayor Rahm Emanuel and the deputy mayor, Andrea Zopp. Wade and her restaurant were featured on Restaurant: Impossible in 2019.
