= Michael, Brother of Jerry =

1917 novel by Jack London

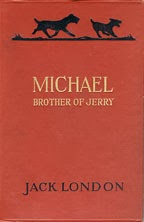
- Hardcover first edition
- Author: Jack London
- Language: English
- Genre: Fiction novel
- Publisher: The Macmillan Company
- Publication date: 1917
- Publication place: United States
- Media type: Print
- Pages: 344 pp.
- Preceded by: Jerry of the Islands

Michael, Brother of Jerry is a novel by Jack London released in 1917. This novel is loosely connected to his previous novel Jerry of the Islands, also released in 1917. Each book tells the story of one of two dog siblings, Jerry and Michael, born in the Solomon Islands.

== Plot ==
Michael, an Irish Terrier, was born and raised in the Solomon Islands. The dog now works as a slave hunter aboard a schooner on a mission to recruit native islanders for work. One day the captain accidentally leaves Michael on a beach and sails away. Michael was then abducted by Dag Daughtry, a steward on another ship, who initially planned to sell the dog for money. However, later he got attached to Michael and takes the dog to a trip around the world.

A major theme in the book is how various animals are taught to perform for the public. In his Foreword, Jack London says that this was a major reason for writing the book.
