= MSPCA-Angell =

American animal welfare nonprofit

Coordinates: 42.3229°N 71.111°W

- Massachusetts Society for the Prevention of Cruelty to Animals-Angell Animal Medical Center
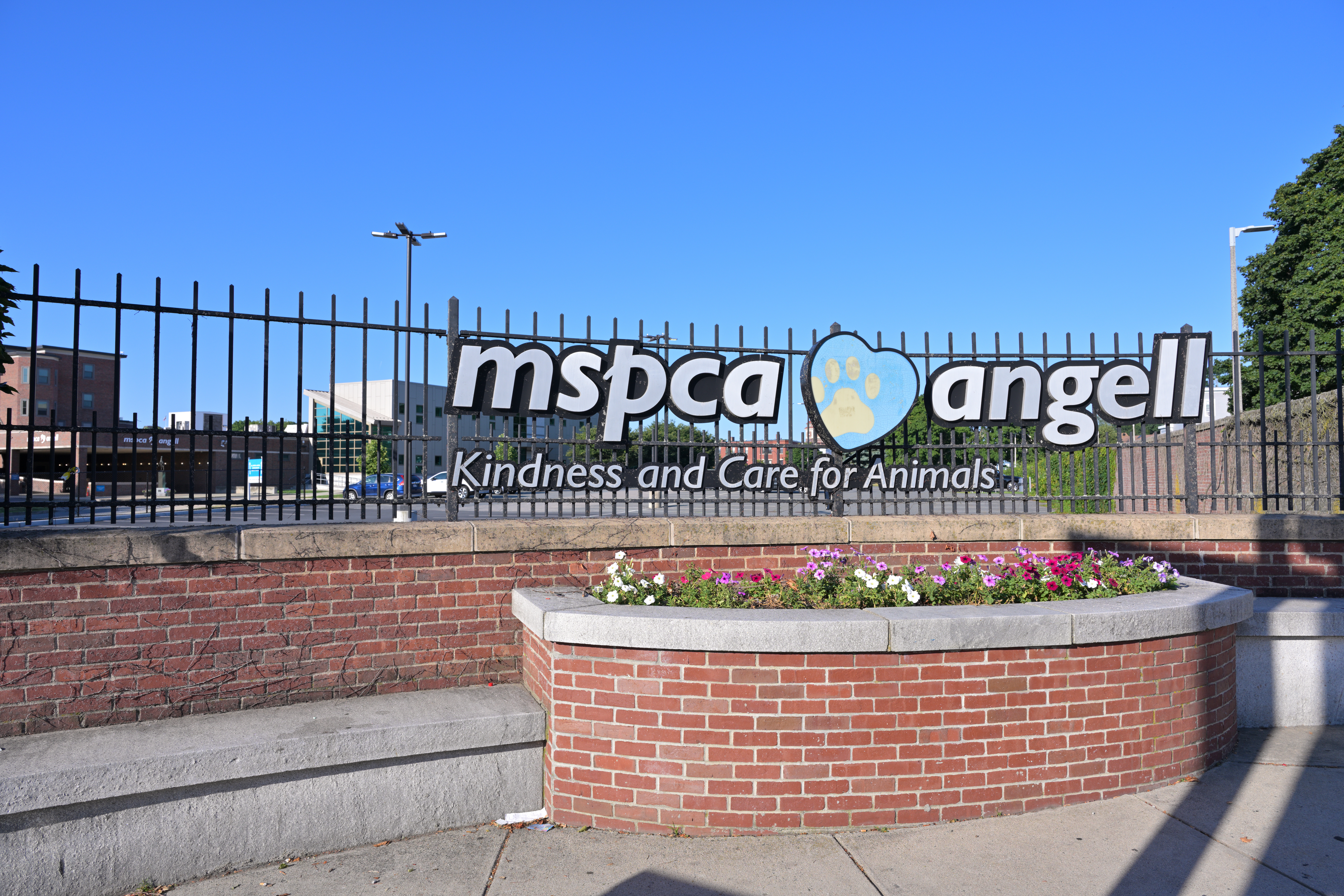
- MSPCA-Angell sign
- Formation: 1868; 158 years ago
- Founder: George Thorndike Angell
- Merger of: Massachusetts Society for the Prevention of Cruelty; Angell Animal Medical Center
- Type: 501(c)(3) organization
- Tax ID no.: EIN 042103597
- Purpose: Promoting animal welfare
- Headquarters: Huntington Avenue, Jamaica Plain
- Location: Boston, Massachusetts, United States
- Region served: Massachusetts
- Website: mspca.org
- Formerly called: Massachusetts Society for the Prevention of Cruelty

The Massachusetts Society for the Prevention of Cruelty to Animals-Angell Animal Medical Center (MSPCA-Angell) is an American animal welfare nonprofit organization. Its main headquarters are located on South Huntington Avenue in the Jamaica Plain neighborhood of Boston, Massachusetts. It was founded in 1868, and is the second-oldest humane society in the United States. "MSPCA-Angell" was adopted as the society's identity in 2003, and indicates the names of its two closely related predecessor organizations: Massachusetts Society for the Prevention of Cruelty to Animals and Angell Animal Medical Center (formerly known as Angell Memorial Animal Hospital). The organization provides direct care to thousands of homeless, injured, and abused animals each year, and provides animal adoption, a veterinary hospital, advocacy, and humane law enforcement.

== History ==
Boston Brahmin lawyer George Thorndike Angell began a high-profile protest of animal cruelty in 1868, after reading about two horses being raced to death by carrying two riders each over forty miles of rough roads. He joined with Emily Appleton, a Boston socialite and animal lover who provided financial support, and they and 1,200 others formed the Massachusetts Society for the Prevention of Cruelty to Animals (MSPCA). Among distinguished locals on the first board of directors were John Quincy Adams II, Henry Saltonstall, and William Gordon Weld.

Also in 1868, they began publication of Our Dumb Animals, a magazine "to speak for those who cannot speak for themselves". ("Dumb" refers to the fact that animals cannot speak.) The Boston Police Department helped distribute their first press run of 200,000 copies. Influenced by the activities of this organization, the Massachusetts General Court passed the first anti-animal-cruelty act in Massachusetts the following year.

Nevins Farm before Harriet Nevins donated it to the MSPCA

In 1886, the society's first official headquarters were dedicated at 19 Milk Street in Downtown Crossing. The first MSPCA branch was established in Springfield, Massachusetts, in 1914. It closed in 2009 due to economic factors. In 1915, a veterinary clinic known as the Angell Memorial Animal Hospital was established on Boston's Longwood Avenue. In 1917, the MSPCA established a permanent animal shelter at Nevins Farm in Methuen, Massachusetts, to care for retired police horses and other working animals. It is still the only open-door horse and farm animal rescue center in New England. Shelter for small animals was added to the Methuen facility in 1924.

Francis H. Rowley succeeded George T. Angell as President in 1910. He held this position until his retirement in 1945.

In 1927, the society formed the American Fondouk Maintenance Committee in Fez, Morocco, and opened a center there two years later. In 1929, an animal hospital joined the MSPCA's Springfield location, but closed in 2007 due to economic circumstances. In 1935, the Cape Cod Animal Shelter was opened in Centerville, Massachusetts, now part of MSPCA-Angell. The following year, an MSPCA animal shelter opened in Pittsfield, Massachusetts, now known as Berkshire Humane Society. The Angell Memorial Animal Hospital launched the first veterinary intern training program in 1940. In 1943, Angell was first to apply techniques of aseptic surgery to small animal medicine and surgery. The MSPCA assumed control of the Foote Memorial Animal Shelter on Martha's Vineyard in 1945 until 2009, when ownership of the shelter was transferred to a local animal shelter. Also in 1945, Angell became the first veterinary hospital to institute 24-hour nursing and veterinary care. In 1950, the MSPCA opened an animal shelter and hospital on Nantucket, which was operated by the MSPCA until 2012, when Nantucket veterinarians purchased the hospital and opened it as the "Offshore Animal Hospital of Nantucket". Also in 1950, the Royal Society for the Prevention of Cruelty to Animals (RSPCA) in Great Britain joined with the MSPCA to create the International Society for the Protection of Animals (now the World Animal Protection). In 1959, MSPCA President Dr. Eric Hansen was elected first president of the ISPA.

Jean Holzworth, a leading expert on feline medicine, practised at Angell from 1950 to 1986. Together with Angell colleagues, Holzworth authored a number of pioneering studies of disorders affecting cats, including feline infectious peritonitis and hyperthyroidism.

Angell Memorial Animal Hospital built a veterinary intensive care unit in 1959 that was the first of its kind. In 1962, the MSPCA and ISPA began work to improve inhumane slaughterhouses in Latin America. In 1964, the MSPCA launched "Operation Gwamba" in Suriname which saved 9,737 animals from hydroelectric dam flooding and was the largest such project in history.

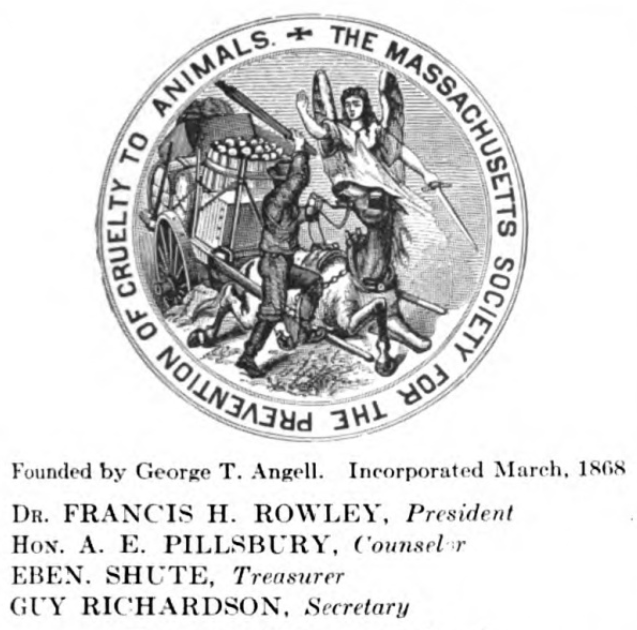
MSPCA logo, 1921

The MSPCA and Angell Memorial Animal Hospital moved into a shared facility at 350 South Huntington Avenue in 1976, which was the most extensive animal service center ever created by a humane society. An adoption center was established at this location as well.

The MSPCA assisted law enforcement officers in animal rescue after eruption of Mount St. Helens in 1979. Conditions at Boston's Franklin Park Zoo were improved through the direct involvement of the MSPCA, starting in 1982. In 1986, MSPCA-Angell launched the statewide subsidized Spay/Neuter Assistance Program (SNAP) for low income pet owners who qualify. The MSPCA formed the Center for Laboratory Animal Welfare (CLAW) in 1992 and, in the following year, established the Animal Disaster Relief Fund to aid in animal protection and rescue globally.

In 1994, a new MSPCA facility was opened in Brockton, Massachusetts, and Nevins Farm in Methuen launched the Equine Ambulance Program to offer emergency rescue and transport of disabled horses in New England and ambulance services events involving horses worldwide. In 1994, the society established Phinney's Friends, the first program run by a humane society to assist people with HIV/AIDS and their pets. The Shalit-Glazer Clinic was formed in 1996 to provide spay-neuter surgery for pets of low-income families.

In 1997, Angell established the Cancer Care Center to provide on-site radiation therapy for animals. The same year, the MSPCA Archives Library was dedicated.

In 2013, advocacy efforts led to the passage of the Animal Control Law – the most significant animal-related legislation in decades. Also that year, a unified Animal Behavior Program began with the Adoption Centers and Angell Animal Medical Center.

In 2014, the first canine total elbow replacement surgery was performed at Angell by Dr. Nick Trout and Sun Valley Animal Center’s Dr. Randy Acker, who designed and developed the TATE Elbow system.

== Services ==
As of 2012, the MSPCA-Angell operates three Animal Care and Adoption Centers: Boston, Nevins Farm and Equine Center (Methuen), and Cape Cod. It also operates Angell Animal Medical Center in Boston and, since 2014, MSPCA-Angell West in Waltham, both 24/7 emergency facilities. Together these facilities employ nearly 80 full-time veterinarians including board-certified specialists in fields such as 24/7 emergency and critical care, avian and exotic medicine, anesthesiology, behavior, cardiology, dentistry, dermatology, diagnostic imaging and nuclear medicine, internal medicine, I-131 treatment for hyperthyroid cats, neurology, nutrition, oncology, ophthalmology, pain medicine, pathology, surgery, and preventative medicine.

Angell Animal Medical Center has magnetic resonance imaging equipment, with a state-of-the-art, high-speed updated machine installed in November 2014 to replace the original Angell MRI. The original Angell MRI was the first MRI located within a veterinary hospital in New England and the second available in the United States. This equipment was part of a $28 million building campaign to improve the Boston facility. The renovation was completed in 2005. The refurnished Boston facility also includes the Helen Schmidt Stanton Clinical Care Center and the Copeland Animal Care and Adoption Center. Also among Angell's equipment is a high speed CT unit offering multi-detector computed tomography (MDCT, or multi-slice CT). This machine enables 3D reconstructions of images for accurate diagnoses and better treatment.

Each year, the MSPCA-Angell's veterinary hospital locations welcome over 100,000 patient visits. These locations include MSPCA-Angell Clinics in Boston, Methuen and Centreville, Massachusetts for low-income clients as well as the MSPCA-Angell West in Waltham, Massachusetts and Angell Animal Medical Center in Boston which both provide 24 x 7 emergency service, specialty care and primary care.

The MSPCA has a Law Enforcement Department and organizes the annual Walk for Animals on Boston Common.

== Statements of belief ==
MSPCA-Angell takes a strong stand on a number of animal-related issues and is influential in creating animal-related legislation in Massachusetts. Among the areas in which MSPCA-Angell takes a position are:

- Animal Control: a comprehensive category of concern which includes advocacy for the prevention of animal overpopulation, proper leashing and humane confinement of animals, responsible standards for animal adoption, and humane euthanasia of animals when appropriate
- Animal Fighting: the society is "unequivocally opposed" to setting one animal against a person or other animal as is done in dogfighting, cockfighting, bullbaiting, and bullfighting
- Assistance Animals: the society advocates that it is critical that the needs both the animals and the people they assist are met
- Classroom Animals: the society believe that animals should only be kept as classroom pets "if they are acquired for the purpose of educating students about the sentience of animals and the need for responsible, humane care"
- Cosmetic Surgery in Animals: the society opposes ear cropping and tail docking in dogs, tail myotomy in horses and any "surgery done on animals solely for cosmetic reasons or to disguise an imperfection"
- Dangerous Dog Laws: the society opposes breed-specific legislation and believes that these laws are not an effective way to control dangerous dogs
- Declawing Cats: the society states that onychectomy is neither a minor procedure nor a painless one and therefore opposes it being done for non-medical reasons
- Devocalization of Animals: likewise, the society opposes debarking of dogs and laryngectomy of animals in general
- Euthanasia of Shelter Animals: recognizing that the number of animals in shelter exceeds the number of responsible people available to adopt them, the society condones euthanasia but condemns the use of high-altitude decompression chambers, electrocution, injectable paralytic agents, unfiltered and uncooled carbon monoxide, and drowning for this purpose
- Factory Farming (Intensive Husbandry Practices): believing "that farm animals are creatures of intrinsic value, complexity and dignity" and that "the billions of animals raised each year in the United States for food, clothing, and other products are entitled to live their lives free of unnecessary pain, suffering and stress, as well as to a humane death", the society condemns many practices associated with factory farming while accepting the responsible and appropriate use of electric fencing to contain livestock, selective breeding for desirable characteristics, and ear tags, tattoos, microchips, and freeze branding (but not hot branding) for animal identification
- Furs: the society is against fur farming, fur trapping, and the use of fur in general saying "no valid justification exists for killing animals for their fur, since fur items are generally marketed and purchased solely as symbols of status and wealth and are unnecessary for meeting human needs"

Other areas in which MSPCA-Angell has a position are genetic engineering and animal patenting, the training of guard dogs to increase their aggression, hunting for sport or as a tool for wildlife management, the capture of wild animals as pets and attempts at their domestication, the commercialization of animal breed by pet stores, and the use of animals in rodeos. The MSPCA-Angell also takes a relatively negative view of zoological parks and aquaria unless such institutions meet "rigid criteria, without which there is insufficient justification for their existence"

In 2007, the MSPCA-Angell led a successful campaign for the Boston City Council to create a city ordinance prohibiting pet rental agencies from operating in Boston.

== See also ==
- Nevins Farm and Equine Center
