= George Thorndike Angell =

American lawyer, animal welfare and food safety advocate (1823–1909)

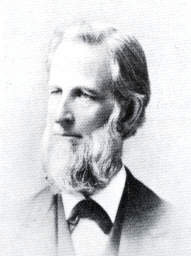
- Born: June 5, 1823; Southbridge, Massachusetts, U.S.
- Died: March 16, 1909 (aged 85); Boston, Massachusetts, U.S.
- Resting place: Mount Auburn Cemetery
- Occupations: Lawyer; philanthropist; activist
- Known for: Animal welfare activism

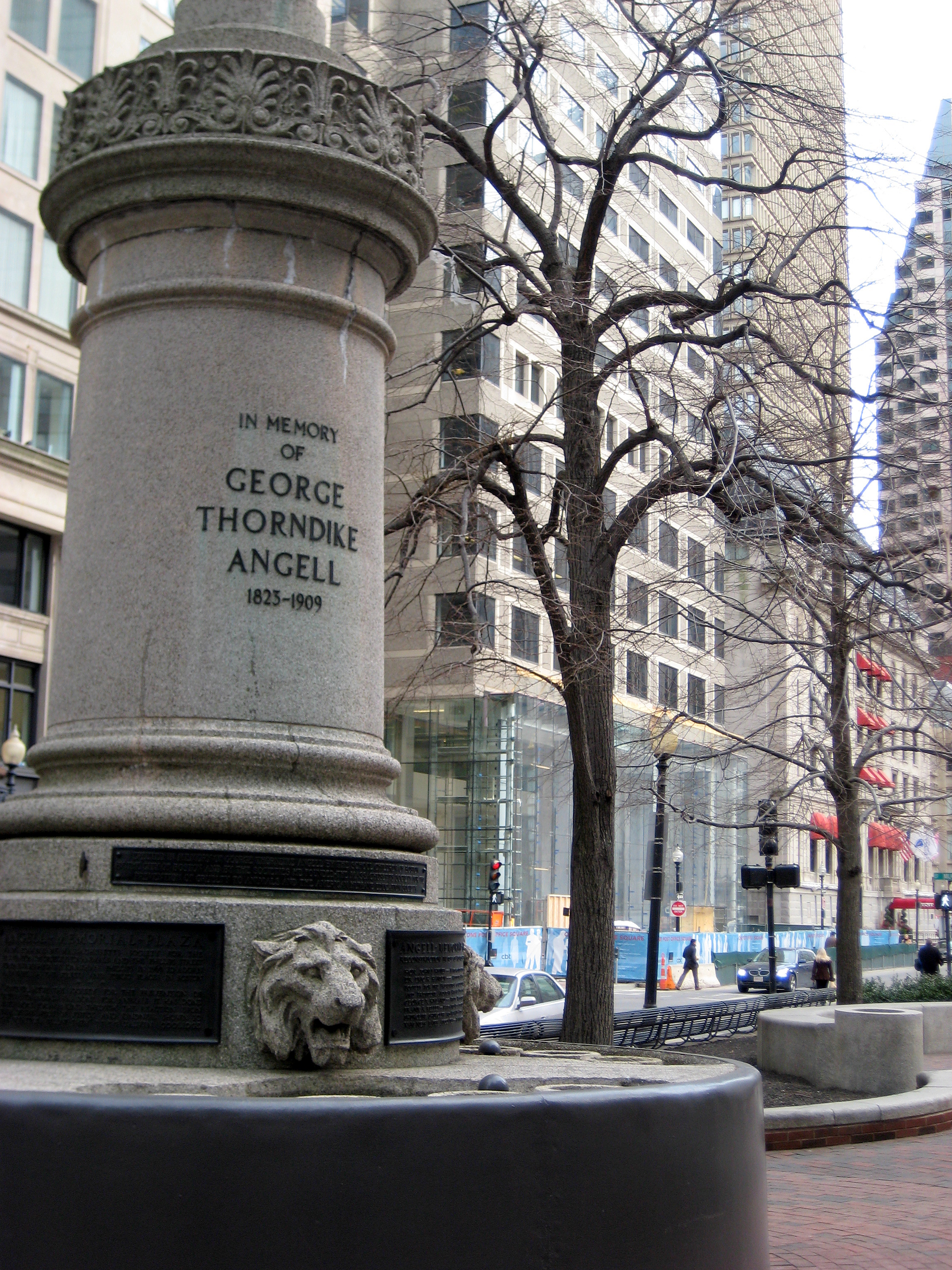
Detail of monument to George Thorndike Angell in the Financial District, Boston, Massachusetts

George Thorndike Angell (June 5, 1823 – March 16, 1909) was an American lawyer, philanthropist, and activist. He advocated for animal welfare, founding and serving as president of the Massachusetts Society for the Prevention of Cruelty to Animals. He also championed public health reform and opposed food adulteration.

== Biography ==
George Thorndike Angell was born in Southbridge, Massachusetts, graduated from Dartmouth College in 1846, studied law at the Harvard Law School, and in 1851 was admitted to the bar in Boston, where he practiced for many years.

While attending horse races in 1866 he witnessed two horses being run to death. Motivated by this incident and inspired by the work of Henry Bergh in New York, his advocacy for the humane treatment of animals became a lifelong passion.

In 1868 Angell founded and became president of the Massachusetts Society for the Prevention of Cruelty to Animals, in the same year establishing and becoming editor of Our Dumb Animals, a journal for the promotion of organized effort in securing the humane treatment of animals. For many years he was active in the organization of humane societies in England and America.

In 1882, Angell and the Rev. Thomas Timmins initiated the movement to establish Bands of Mercy (for the promotion of humane treatment of animals), of which in 1908 there were more than 72,000 chapters in active existence. In 1889 he founded and became president of the American Humane Education Society.

Angell also became well known as an advocate of laws for the safeguarding of the public health and against food adulteration.

== Death ==
After suffering from failing health for a long time, Angell died at his apartments at the Hotel Westminster in Boston on March 16, 1909, at the age of 85. He is buried at Mount Auburn Cemetery, between Cambridge and Watertown.

== Selected publications ==
- Cattle Transportation in the United States (1872)
- The Check-Rein (1872)
- Protection of Animals (1874)
- Autobiographical Sketches and Personal Recollections (1882)
