= Stone Cold (Demi Lovato song) =

2016 single by Demi Lovato

Single by Demi Lovato

from the album Confident
- Released: March 21, 2016
- Studio: MXM Studios (Los Angeles)
- Genre: Soul
- Length: 3:11
- Label: Hollywood; Island; Republic; Safehouse
- Songwriters: Demi Lovato; Laleh Pourkarim; Gustaf Thörn
- Producer: Laleh Pourkarim

Demi Lovato singles chronology
"Irresistible" (2015)	"Stone Cold" (2016)	"Without a Fight" (2016)

Music video
- "Stone Cold" on YouTube

"Stone Cold" is a song by American singer Demi Lovato from her fifth studio album Confident (2015). The song was co-written by Lovato with Laleh Pourkarim, who also served as the song's producer, and Gustaf Thörn. It was released to digital retailers on October 9, 2015, through Hollywood Records and Island Records as the first and only promotional single off the album, one week prior to the album's release. The song was initially premiered on radio via 97.1 FM on February 6, 2016. It was sent to contemporary hit radio on March 21, 2016, as the third and final single from the album. On April 8, the song was sent to hot adult contemporary radio.

A power ballad, "Stone Cold" discusses the pain of watching an ex move on and be happy with someone else. The song incorporates pop and soul influences, and is centered on a piano melody, with a stripped-down production aimed at highlighting Lovato's vocals. Some critics drew comparisons to Lovato's 2011 single "Skyscraper" and the works of Adele.

== Composition ==
"Stone Cold" is a soul ballad. It was written by Lovato, Laleh Pourkarim and Gustaf Thörn. According to the digital sheet music published by Kobalt Music Publishing America, Inc., "Stone Cold" was originally composed in the key of F minor with a "moderately fast" tempo of approximately 144 BPM. Lovato showcases a vocal range on the track, alternating between belting the verses and delivering other lines such as "I'm happy for you" softly, and spans from the low note of F_{3} to the high note of G♯_{5}. The song features a stripped-down production style that focuses primarily on piano and vocals.

The song's lyrics portray the pain of watching an ex move on after a breakup and trying to be happy for them once they find happiness with someone else. A writer from Billboard compared the song to Lovato's 2011 single "Skyscraper" and the works of Adele. During an interview with Ryan Seacrest, Lovato stated, "This song is your heartbreak song. I wanted to have a song that people can listen to when they're going through it, or they're thinking about a time they were heartbroken." She also added that "Stone Cold" "is the type of song that I wanted people to feel in their hearts and ripped their guts out."

== Critical reception ==
Christina Garibaldi of MTV praised Lovato's vocals, claiming that she had "reached new heights" on the song, as well as her emotional delivery.

== Music videos ==
A video featuring a "live in studio" rendition of the song was uploaded to Lovato's Vevo account on October 7, 2015, in promotion of the song's release. On February 19, 2016, Lovato revealed a teaser video for the song's official music video on Twitter. The full music video, directed by Patrick Ecclesine, was released via her Vevo channel on February 23, 2016. The music video was shot in Park City, Utah.

The music video shows Lovato at various locations, such as snowy mountains and a bathtub clothed, singing in a depressive manner. The video ends with a shot of Lovato in the snow.

== Live performances ==
Lovato debuted the song on September 29, 2015, during her performance at the Highline Ballroom in New York City. On October 17, 2015, she performed "Stone Cold", as well as a medley of "Cool for the Summer" and "Confident" on Saturday Night Live during the series' forty-first season. Furthermore, "Stone Cold" was a part of Lovato's setlist at the 2015 106.1 KISS FM Fall Ball on November 14, 2015. On December 11, 2015, she performed the song at Billboard Women in Music 2015 event in New York City where she was honored with the first Rulebreaker Award. Lovato also included the song in her setlist during the 2015 Jingle Ball Tour. On February 10, 2016, she performed the song on The Ellen DeGeneres Show. Lovato performed "Stone Cold" on American Idol on March 3, 2016, and on The Late Late Show on March 16, 2016. On April 2, 2016, she performed the song at the 27th GLAAD Media Awards in Los Angeles where she received the GLAAD Vanguard Award. The next day, she gave another rendition of the song at the 3rd iHeartRadio Music Awards joined by Brad Paisley on guitar. On May 14, 2016, Lovato performed "Stone Cold" as a part of her setlist at the 2016 edition of Wango Tango. She performed the song on The Late Late Show with James Corden for the second time, during the Carpool Karaoke segment, which appeared online on May 16, 2016.

== Credits and personnel ==
Credits adapted from the liner notes of Confident.

Recording

- Recorded at MXM Studios, Los Angeles, United States
- Mixed at MixStar Studios, Virginia Beach, United States
- Mastered at Sterling Sound, New York City, United States

Management

- Published by Ddlovato Music (ASCAP) and MXM (ASCAP)
- All rights administered by Kobalt Songs Music Publishing (ASCAP)

Personnel

- Demi Lovato – lead vocals, songwriter, piano, background vocals
- Laleh Pourkarim – songwriter, producer, engineering, cello arranging, drum programming, piano, synth, bass, background vocals
- Gustaf Thörn – songwriter, engineering assistant, string arranging, synth, piano, background vocals
- Eru Matsumoto – cello, drum programming
- Serban Ghenea – mixing
- Tom Coyne – mastering

== Charts ==
Chart performance for "Stone Cold"
Chart (2015–2016)	Peak position
Belgium (Ultratip Bubbling Under Flanders)	27
Canada Hot 100 (Billboard)	79
Israel (Media Forest TV Airplay)	3
US Bubbling Under Hot 100 (Billboard)	2
US Pop Airplay (Billboard)	36

== Certifications ==
Region	Certification	Certified units/sales
Australia (ARIA)	Platinum	70,000^{‡}
Brazil (Pro-Música Brasil)	Diamond	250,000^{‡}
Denmark (IFPI Danmark)	Gold	45,000^{‡}
New Zealand (RMNZ)	Platinum	30,000^{‡}
Norway (IFPI Norway)	Gold	30,000^{‡}
Portugal (AFP)	Gold	10,000^{‡}
Spain (Promusicae)	Gold	30,000^{‡}
United Kingdom (BPI)	Silver	200,000^{‡}
United States (RIAA)	Platinum	1,000,000^{‡}
^{‡} Sales+streaming figures based on certification alone.

== Release history ==
Region	Date	Format	Label
United States	9 October 2015	Digital download – Promotional single	Hollywood; Island; Republic; Safehouse
United States	21 March 2016	Contemporary hit radio	Hollywood; Island; Republic; Safehouse
United States	4 April 2016	Hot AC radio	Hollywood; Island; Republic; Safehouse

== Other appearances ==
- In 2016, the song was performed live by Teodora Sava when she was 14 years old, as a special guest of the Romanian kids talent show Next Star.
- It was covered by The Voice contestants Alisan Porter, Brooke Simpson, Presley Tennant, and the young duo Hello Sunday in seasons 10, 13, 16, and 17, respectively.
- Kazakh singer Daneliya Tuleshova sang a cover for her blind audition on The Voice Kids Ukraine season 4, where she eventually won, which became a viral video.
- In 2022, Welsh singer Charlotte Church performed the song as Mushroom on the third series of Masked Singer UK.
