= Faces of Sunset Boulevard =

2008 book by Patrick Ecclesine

Faces of Sunset Boulevard: A Portrait of Los Angeles
- Author: Patrick Ecclesine
- Cover artist: Patrick Ecclesine
- Language: English
- Genre: Photo book, coffee table book
- Publication date: 2008
- Publication place: United States
- Media type: Print

Faces of Sunset Boulevard: A Portrait of Los Angeles is a 2008 photography and coffee table book by Patrick Ecclesine that won Top Photo Book of 2008 by Shutterbug magazine. PopMatters literary critic Rodger Jacobs stated Patrick Ecclesine's "Faces of Sunset Boulevard is, without a doubt, one of the strongest statements about man's dark fate in the West ever committed to paper in the author and photographer's chosen form... as compelling as any novel."

Faces of Sunset Boulevard tied for first place with Annie Leibovitz's book At Work to win the 2009 SCIBA Art and Architecture Book Award.
