= Ecclesine =

Ecclesine is a surname. Notable people with the surname include:

- Patrick Ecclesine, American photographer
- Thomas C. E. Ecclesine (1846–1895), American lawyer and politician
