= Jack London's San Francisco Stories =

2010 anthology

- Book cover (paperback)
- Author: Jack London, Matthew Asprey (editor), Rodger Jacobs (preface)
- Language: English
- Genre: American Literature anthology
- Publisher: Sydney Samizdat Press
- Publication date: 2010
- Publication place: Australia
- Media type: Print (paperback)
- Pages: 312 pp
- ISBN: 1-4538-4050-8

Jack London's San Francisco Stories is an anthology of Jack London short stories set in the San Francisco Bay Area. The book was edited by Matthew Asprey. The preface is a reprint of Rodger Jacobs' 2003 essay Ghost Land, a personal meditation on Heinold's First and Last Chance Saloon in Oakland, California. The anthology is published by Sydney Samizdat Press through Amazon's CreateSpace print on demand service.

== Background ==
Jack London was born in San Francisco in 1876 and wrote about the Bay Area repeatedly throughout his career. Those stories have never been previously collected in a single Bay Area-themed volume. As the back cover copy of the book states, "Although famous for his stories of the Klondike and the Pacific, London wrote extensively about his home base. This collection contains such classic stories as 'The Apostate' and 'The South of the Slot' as well as extracts from John Barleycorn and The Sea-Wolf. The overlooked 1905 story cycle Tales of the Fish Patrol is included in its entirety. London's vivid eyewitness report of the Great 1906 Earthquake and Fire - which destroyed forever the old city - stands as a fitting epilogue."

The cover of the collection reproduces a photograph of Market Street in San Francisco circa 1900.

Rodger Jacobs discussed the book in an article for the Las Vegas Sun on September 26, 2010 and in an interview with Montreal's La Presse on November 20, 2010. San Francisco writer Don Herron reviewed the book on January 27, 2011. He said: "A meaty compactly packaged book. If you don’t have these stories, a great intro to a city that was lost in the 1906 quake and fire, by the most famous author born in town."

== Contents ==
The collection is divided into four parts with an epilogue.

Preface by Rodger Jacobs

Introduction by Matthew Asprey

I. YOUTH

- from John Barleycorn
- The Apostate
- From ‘Small-Boat Sailing’
- To Repel Boarders
- from John Barleycorn

II. TALES OF THE FISH PATROL

- White and Yellow
- The King of the Greeks
- A Raid on the Oyster Pirates
- The Siege of the ‘Lancashire Queen’
- Charley's Coup
- Demetrios Contos
- Yellow Handkerchief

III. THE BAY AREA

- The Banks of the Sacramento
- An Adventure in the Upper Sea
- Winged Blackmail
- When the World Was Young
- The Prodigal Father
- Benefit of the Doubt

IV. SAN FRANCISCO PAST AND FUTURE

- from John Barleycorn
- from The Sea-Wolf
- South of the Slot
- The Dream of Debs

EPILOGUE: 18 April 1906

- The Story of an Eyewitness
