= Ardu =

Ardu may refer to:

- Ardu, Estonia
- Ardú Vocal Ensemble, an Irish a cappella group
- Aircraft Research and Development Unit, of the Royal Australian Air Force
- Mimí Ardú (born 1956), Argentinian actress and vedette

== See also ==
- Ardue, County Cavan, Ireland
- Urdu, official language of Pakistan
