= I Was Here (song) =

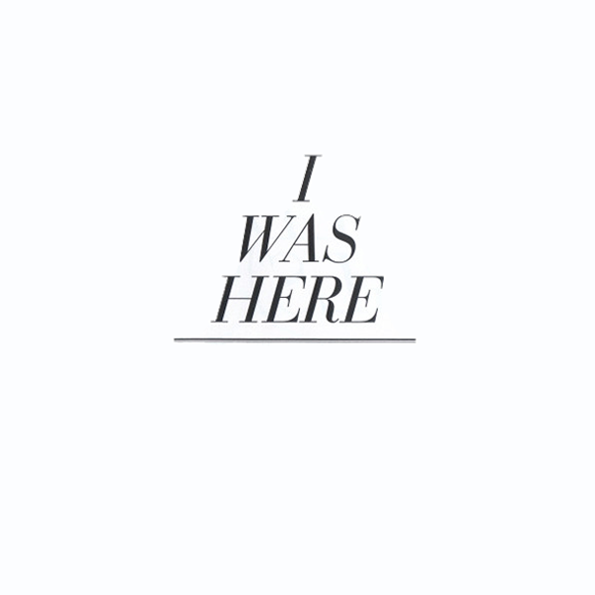

Song by Beyoncé

from the album 4
- Released: June 28, 2011
- Recorded: May 2011
- Studio: Patriot Studios (Denver; Colorado); Boston Harbor Hotel (Boston, Massachusetts); Lear 60/G2 Studios
- Genre: R&B
- Length: 3:57
- Label: Columbia
- Songwriter: Diane Warren
- Producers: Ryan Tedder; Brent Kutzle; Beyoncé Knowles; Kuk Harrell

"I Was Here" is a song recorded by American singer Beyoncé from her fourth studio album, 4 (2011). It was written by Diane Warren, while production was handled by OneRepublic members Ryan Tedder and Brent Kutzle, alongside Kuk Harrell. "I Was Here" is a reflective R&B ballad, in which Beyoncé reviews her past, wanting to leave an impact on the world before her life comes to an end. Described as a "career song" by Warren, its development was motivated by the September 11 attacks in the United States.

Following the release of 4, "I Was Here" charted at number 131 on the UK Singles Chart, 74 on the Swiss Singles Chart, and 44 on the South Korea Gaon International Singles Chart in early July 2011. Later, in 2012, the song also appeared on several charts internationally.

A music video for the song was released on August 19, 2012, and it features Beyoncé, wearing a Marc Bouwer gown, performing the song live at the United Nations General Assembly Hall while images of volunteers doing humanitarian work were projected on the screen behind her. Upon its release, it received positive reviews from music critics who praised the projections, Beyoncé's vocal performance and her look.

In late July, the song was included on the soundtrack for the 2011 FIFA Women's World Cup Final. "I Was Here" was also part of Beyoncé's set list for her residency show 4 Intimate Nights with Beyoncé and was used in the Revel Presents: Beyoncé Live shows during an interlude. The live video from the DVD Live at Roseland: Elements of 4 appeared online on November 16, 2011, containing Beyoncé's home movies and professional highlights. "I Was Here" was covered by Lea Michele for Glee's soundtrack album Glee: The Music, The Graduation Album (2012).

== Development and recording ==
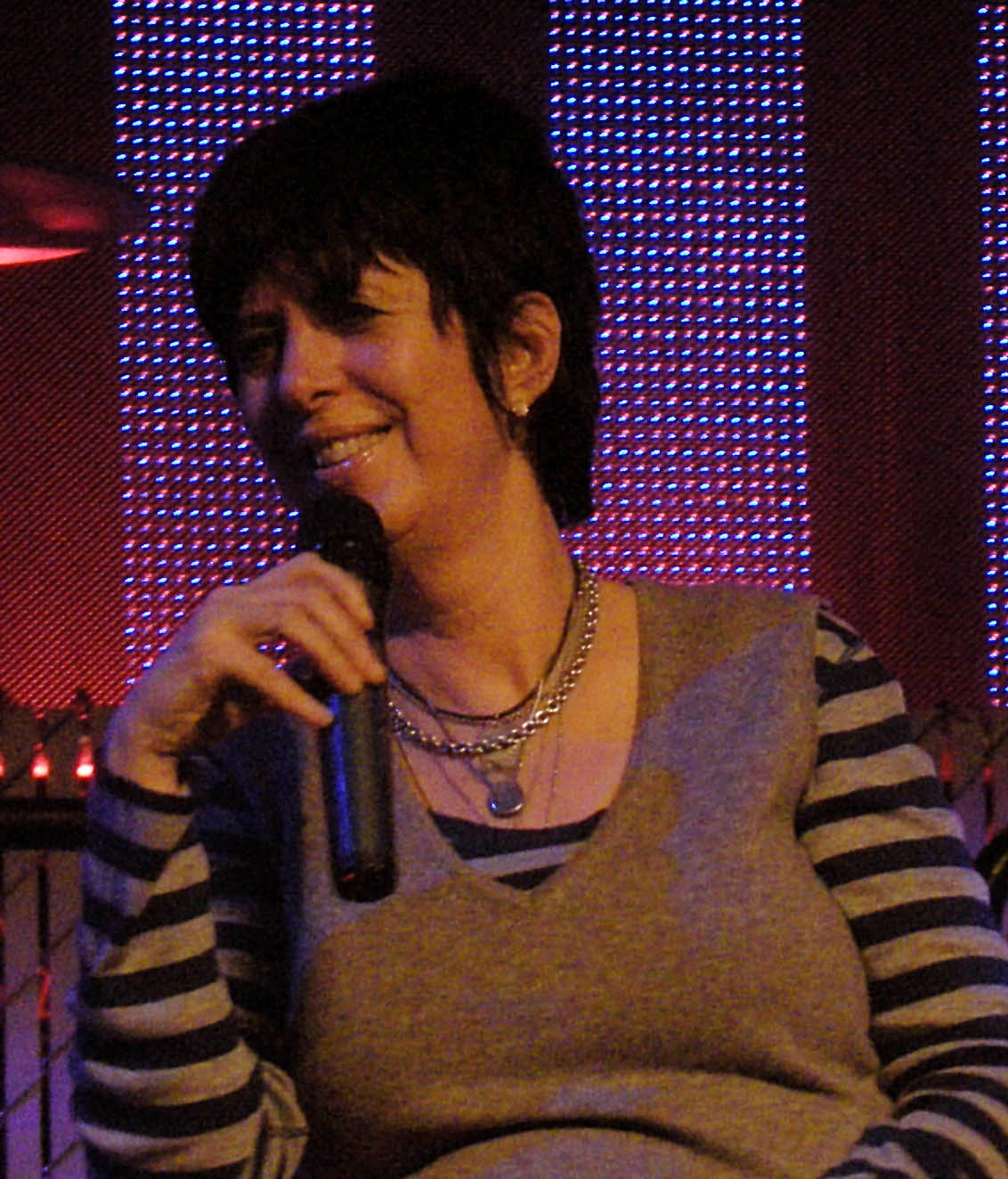
Diane Warren

"I Was Here" was written by Diane Warren and was produced by Ryan Tedder, Brent Kutzle, Beyoncé and Kuk Harrell. "I Was Here" is the only song on the record that was not co-written by Beyoncé. The development of "I Was Here" was motivated by the September 11 attacks. "I thought that the one artist who would be my dream to sing ['I Was Here'] would be Beyoncé," said Warren. "This is one of those magical stories where what is meant to be actually happens."

"I knew ['I Was Here'] was going to be a very special song. It just fit[s] where I was in my life and expressed something I believed and wanted to share. As an artist, you want your music to mean something or to help someone get through something, and when a song has a great message and meaning, it is what you strive for."

— Beyoncé Knowles, Billboard.

In May 2011, Warren played the song on a guitar over the phone to Beyoncé's husband Jay-Z, who then called her. Upon hearing "I Was Here", Beyoncé immediately made up her mind, "Oh my god, I have to have this song." September 2011 was going to mark the tenth anniversary of the September 11 attacks and Beyoncé thought that the song would perfectly complete her album, which had nearly reached completion. The mastering of 4 was delayed to allow Beyoncé to record the song. Warren was present at the recording sessions, which took place two days following her conversation with Beyoncé and Jay-Z on the phone. She said, "There's nothing better than to hear the song that you came up with [sung back]. It's like your heart found another heart", before adding:

I've never had chills through my entire body like I had from hearing Beyoncé sing this song. 'I Was Here' came from my soul and became the song that was coming from hers. In all my life, I have never heard anything as amazing as this. Hearing her sing 'I Was Here' will forever be one of the best moments of my life, and I know that this song will touch many other lives as well.

== Composition ==
"I Was Here"
A 23 second sample of "I Was Here" where, as stated by Joanne Dorken of MTV UK, Knowles "gets all reflective on us, [singing] about leaving a legacy." Spencer Kornhaber of The Atlantic considered it to be Knowles' "existential moment", where she hits upon the justification for how she can claim to be an independent woman and yet feel so totally at "some dude's mercy."

"I Was Here" is a downtempo R&B ballad that is instrumentally based on synthesizers undercurrent, indie rock guitars, musical keyboards and big drums provided by Tedder and Kutzle. The sound of the song's recurring hook uses a combination of a xylophone and a piano. According to the sheet music published by Alfred Music Publishing at the website Musicnotes.com, "I Was Here" is written in the key of G major with a 6/8 time signature and has a tempo of 37 beats per minute. The song follows a chord progression of Em–C–D–Dsus–Em–C–Em–C, and Beyoncé's vocals span two octaves from E_{3} to E_{5}.

James Reed of The Boston Globe felt that "['I Was Here'] is 'Halo' on steroids — or Valium." It features Beyoncé as the female protagonist, who wants to make her mark on this Earth before her time is up as she wants that the world remember her impact. Ian Walker of AbsolutePunk elaborated on the song's composition: "'I Was Here' is Beyoncé's monument to the ages. The song climbs higher and higher, chorus by chorus, until Beyoncé reaches her apex, delivering some of her best vocals on the album. The lyrics are a bit uninspired, overly triumphant but somewhat humble as the singer contemplates her mark on history. Although she has garnered massive amounts of acclaim through her storied career, Beyoncé is far from satisfied."

"I Was Here" begins with quivering reverb and a plaintively plucked guitar setting a somber mood for about fifteen seconds before the beats begin alongside Beyoncé's voice. Her vocals set a hushed and morbid tone on the song as she bring doses of edge and grit, singing: "I wanna leave my footprints on the sands of time / Know there was something that meant something that I left behind / When I leave this world, I'll leave no regrets / I'll leave something to remember, So they won't forget". She further sings throughout the song, "The hearts I have touched will be the proof that I leaved that I made a difference". Watery synths shimmer in the background before Beyoncé adopts an authoritative tone to chant the chorus lines: "I was here / I lived, I loved / I was here / I did, I've done / Everything that I wanted / And it was more than I thought it would be / I will leave my mark so everyone will know / I was here".

== Critical reception ==
"But then there's Beyoncé, at the center of the mix, intoning in an uncommonly hushed tone, 'I wanna leave my footprints in the sands of time.' Instead of gnashing my teeth, I listen closer, wanting to hear this shockingly affecting elegy directed for once not at one specific lover, but the world that allowed her to express that love in the first place. Oddly enough, the song reminds me of Lars von Trier's best works, which provoke actual emotional reactions while being, on paper, contrived pieces of shit. 'I Was Here', and 4 in general, is that kind of a work, objectively middling, subjectively magnificent."

— Conrad Tao, Sputnikmusic

"I Was Here" garnered mixed to positive reviews from critics, most of whom felt the song's message was too deep for an artist like Beyoncé to sing, and criticized its placement on the track list of 4. Georgette Cline of The Boombox gave the song a positive review stating that, although the lyrics are a bit on the morbid side, it works in Beyoncé's favor, "proving she can tackle a myriad of subjects". Matthew Horton of BBC criticized the song's order of placement on the track list of 4, stating that "'Run the World (Girls)' is tagged on like a bonus track following 'I Was Here', which sounds like the perfect ending for the album." Matthew Perpetua of Rolling Stone also had the same view, saying it "disrupts the flow of up-tempo songs on the second half 4". Perpetua however calls it a "showstopper" and added that it "work[s] well as a bittersweet emotional climax for the album". Perpetua finished his review by saying that "'I Was Here' is the blustery ballad one would expect by a Beyoncé/Warren team-up, and stands off as flat and generic when compared to the rest of 4." Another reviewer of the same magazine, Jody Rosen complimented Beyoncé's vocals stating that she sings with authority; however, he coined "I Was Here" as a low point on the album and added that it is "swamped in 'My Way'-style self-mythologizing."

Steve Jones of USA Today showed appreciation for "I Was Here": "At 29, the still-in-her-prime Beyoncé seems a little young to be worrying about her legacy, as she does on the Warren power ballad I Was Here. But she puts so much feeling into it that it winds up being the album's most moving song." Joanne Dorken of MTV UK was also positive, praising the song's "simple backing music, and Beyoncé's flawless and beautiful voice." She concluded that "I Was Here" ends up being a "standout song on the album [and] we won't be forgetting Queen B in a hurry." Spencer Kornhaber of The Atlantic was also positive, writing, "Payoff comes on 11th song, the epically loping 'I Was Here.' Cameron Adams of the Herald Sun commented that "I Was Here" comes to "a show-stopping moment in a Beyonce concert near you". James Reed of The Boston Globe wrote that the collaboration of Diane Warren and Ryan Tedder, introduces "a new strain of her balladry: an ethereal marriage of R&B sensuality and stuttering indie-rock guitars." Condar Tao of the website Sputnikmusic showed his appreciation for the song, writing, "[...] perhaps even more notable is the record's penultimate track, the Ryan Tedder-produced 'I Was Here'. Tedder is arguably one of the most irritating people working in pop today, and considering his track record, it's not a surprise that 'I Was Here' is the most contemporary-sounding song off of 4. What is surprising is just how good it is. The production is predictably icky, making that increasingly common mistake of using distant footsteps and reverbed guitar to convey a clichéd sense of 'epicness'." Gary Graff of Billboard said that the line "I want to leave my footprints on the sands of time" in the song defined the whole album. Simon Goddard of Q magazine chose "I Was Here" as one of the best songs on 4, describing it as a "breast-clutching tour de fource".

Rich Juzwiak of The Village Voice complimented "I Was Here" as knocking harder than anything on 4's "bloated predecessor", I Am ... Sasha Fierce (2008). Similarly, Embling of Tiny Mix Tapes wrote: "'I Was Here' is a heavy brick of a song — overwrought, maudlin, delusionally grandiose — but it is also disarmingly honest about the addictive, undignified dimensions of fame and celebrity." Genevieve Koski of The A.V. Club described "I Was Here" as "uncomfortably overwrought" although he said that Beyoncé manages to bring conviction to its lyrical content. Adam Markovitz of Entertainment Weekly also gave the song a mixed review stating that it reached a "lifetime-movie levels of schmaltz". David Amidon of PopMatters stated that "I Was Here" is "plain awkward to here a woman as in her prime physically as Beyoncé is to even approach such a tune. The dull music from Ryan Tedder and an army of co-producers does not help matters." Michael Cragg of The Observer gave the song a negative review, stating that it disappoints as being "corny bluster at odds with the laid-back feel of her most accomplished album yet." Andy Gill of The Independent simply stated that "I Was Here" strains too hard for "Empire State of Mind" (2009) status. Greg Kot of Chicago Tribune described the song as a "toxic string of cliches". Hamish MacBain of NME gave "I Was Here" a mixed review stating the song sounds like an X-Factor winner's single, full of unbelievably trite sentiments.

== Chart performance ==
Although "I Was Here" was never released as a single, it appeared on several charts across the world following the release of 4. Selling 14,173 digital downloads, the song opened at number 44 on the South Korea Gaon International Singles Chart for the week ending July 2, 2011 which became its peak position on that chart. Following the release of 4, "I Was Here" also charted at number 131 on the UK Singles Chart on July 9, 2011. "I Was Here" additionally debuted on the Swiss Singles Chart at number 74 on July 10, 2011, before falling off the chart the following week. On the chart issue dated January 16, 2012, "I Was Here" debuted at number 87 on the Australian Singles Chart and number 26 on its urban chart.

After the release of the music video of the song it appeared again on several charts. On the Irish Singles Chart, the song debuted at number 88 for the week ending August 30, 2012 which later became its peak position on that chart. On the Belgian Ultratip Singles Chart, the song debuted at number 83 on September 1, 2012 and four weeks later it peaked at number 16 on September 29, 2012. On the chart issue dated September 8, 2012, the song appeared at number 40 on the UK R&B Chart. The next week it moved three positions up, at number 37, which became its peak position. On the Hungarian Singles Chart, "I Was Here" debuted at number 6 on the chart issue dated September 9, 2012 which also became its peak position on that chart. For the week ending September 22, 2012, the song debuted at number 44 on the US Hot Dance Club Songs. The next week, it moved to number 31, and ascended on the chart over the next weeks. It reached its peak position of number 13 on the chart.

== Music video ==
=== Background and release ===
"It says, 'I want to leave my footprints in the sands of time' and it basically is all of our dreams. And that's leaving our mark on the world. I feel like we all want to know that our life meant something and that we did something for someone else and that we spread positivity, no matter how big or how small... We all have our purpose, and we all have our strengths…it feels so wonderful to do something for someone else. And I think for the U.N. to want to include the whole world was something important, and I feel like that's what I represent."

— Knowles describing the connection between the song and the campaign.

On July 25, 2012, Beyoncé left a message for her fans on her official website stating "Leave Your Footprints on 19 August 2012", the opening lyrics to the song. On July 27, 2012, it was revealed that Beyoncé would be releasing a music video for the song as part of a global launch of World Humanitarian Day, held by the Office for the Coordination of Humanitarian Affairs (OCHA). It was helmed by production company Ridley Scott & Associates and directors Kenzo Digital and Sophie Muller. Droga5, Sara Wallace and RSA Films served as producers of the video with the animation done by Dirt Empire NYC. The campaign aimed to reach 1 billion people with a single message when it launched, further making social media history. Several illustrations were launched on Beyoncé's website explaining how people could leave their mark on the world. The campaign was powered and measured by a new platform called Thunderclap created by creative shop DE-DE which aggregated the social reach of campaign supporters. Droga5's creative chairman David Droga further explained the decision to include Beyoncé for the World Humanitarian Day,

"The hope, first and foremost, was to put this on people's radar. Apart from the UN and a few newsreaders who mention this every year, people don't even know this day exists. It's also to make people realize it's not just about volunteering to go and live in the Congo for four years. It's as much about working a soup kitchen as it is helping an elderly person. Contributing something positive doesn't have to be a lifelong commitment; it can just be daily gestures. So, it was about giving the whole issue perspective... One video and a message aren't going to save everything. But when you say things together, maybe the message will be heard and hopefully will provoke action. Inherently people are good, and inherently people are distracted and somewhat lazy, so it comes down to how do you get people's attention."

Prior to the release of the video, Beyoncé said: "We all see the headlines and we think what can I really do to help?... World Humanitarian Day is an opportunity for all of us to work together to make a difference. This is our time to leave our mark on the world and show that we were here and we care." During another interview posted on the UN website, Beyoncé said she was attracted to raising awareness on the day of recognition: "I found out that 22 people lost their lives helping people [in Baghdad]. I thought it was such an incredible thing to turn that into something positive and try to include the world into doing something great for someone else". Another inspiration for Beyoncé to participate in the campaign were the finalists at the 2012 Do Something Awards and their humanitarian work. Beyoncé also enlisted the help of celebrities Gwyneth Paltrow, Rihanna, Lady Gaga, Justin Bieber, Chris Martin, Shakira, Jay-Z and First Lady Michelle Obama to support the cause as well as Coca-Cola, MTV, and Oreo. On August 3, 2012, Beyoncé released a black and white promotional video for the World Humanitarian Day, produced by Sara Wallace. The video featured Beyoncé saying, "On August 19. It's high time we rise together. Do one thing for a human being. Nothing is too small. … Make your mark and say I was here." The music video was expected to be released simultaneously in the main platforms of television, cinema, projection screens and facilities prepared for buildings in New York, Dubai and Geneva, on August 19. However, it premiered on August 18, 2012, instead. The next day, it was released on the iTunes Store in the US. The performance of the song received positive reviews from music critics and celebrities who attended.

=== Mapping and projection ===
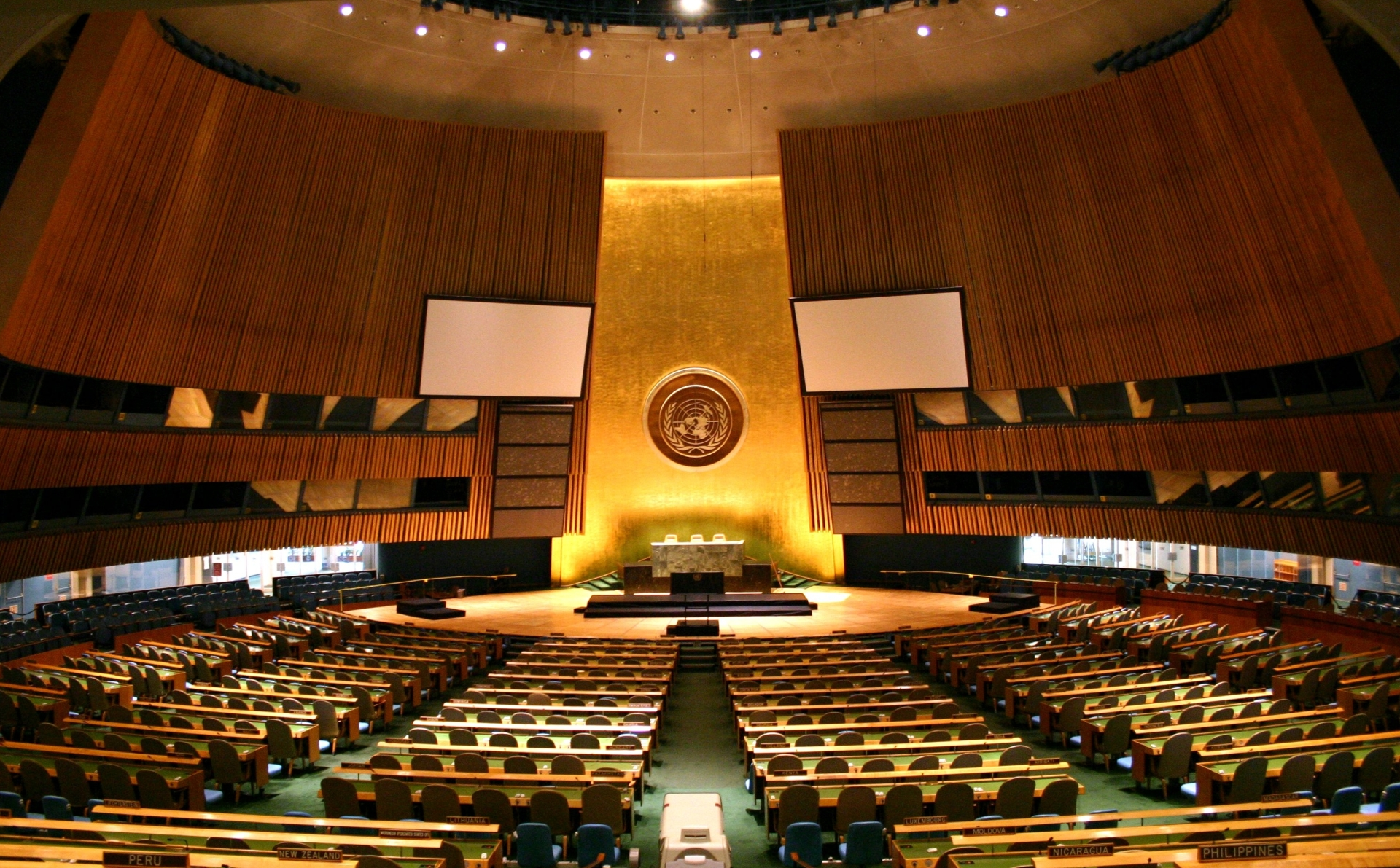
The UN General Assembly Hall (pictured) served as the filming location for the music video.

The video was filmed in front of a live audience at the United Nations General Assembly Hall in New York on August 10, 2012. SuperUber worked on integration between animations and technology, the structure design and projection mapping that took over the General Assembly Hall after it was invited by Kenzo Digital. 10 20K HLM Barco projectors were placed and mapping was done using Pandora's widget designer and 5 Pandora's Dual Box servers. The final video had an 8856 × 1664 resolution and was split into 10 slices of 1080 × 1664 pixels, since each projector was turned on its side and the images were projected vertically in order to cover the whole structure. Two slices were fed into each system and SuperUber did the warping and edge blending inside Pandora. The screen which was used was over 12,000 square feet; Lucas Werthein, a representative for SuperUber commented that it was the largest indoor temporary screen that was a tilted compound curve adding that from an engineering standpoint, it is "extremely complex". It was custom-designed to mold to the inside of the General Assembly Hall. It spanned 68m X 15m and surrounded the audience with a 240 degree immersive projection. Ten synchronized and mapped projections covered the screen with 200,000 lumens, creating one continuous giant image. The screen which weighed 1000 pounds was sewn by forty five people. The whole structure, which was hanging off the UN ceiling weighed 6000 pounds. Werthein revealed, "In order to create the proper tension for the screen to hold its shape we had to weld permanent rigging points into the dome of the general assembly." Peter Kirn of Create Digital Motion wrote that the projection mapping was performed onto a fairly simple surface: "What makes the mapping so effective is the way in which it can fill the space, making those pictures immersive on a grand architectural scale. It makes the image a real volume in which the performance can take place." Russ Rive, SuperUber's director said, "It's an ambitious project that has completely transformed an iconic location – seen as immutable and unchanging, with its goldplated panel and grand volume. By adding a virtual layer to it, we could digitally rebuild it, playing with the architectural elements, and therefore changing the notion of something static. The technology made the integration between animation and architecture. We used projectors to 'paint with light' the UN General Assembly's Hall – a unique opportunity to transform such an emblematic place."

=== Live performance and synopsis ===
On August 10, 2012, Beyoncé appeared at the Assembly for the rehearsals prior to the performance. Julia Stiles, The-Dream and Diane Warren were the celebrities who attended the performance. Prior to the performing the song, Beyoncé met with United Nations leader Ban Ki-moon. Deputy Secretary-General of the United Nations Jan Eliasson, announced Beyoncé's performance giving a short introduction about the singer: "Tonight [she] brings more than her stunning talents; she brings inspiration to help another person, to help another human being". He further recalled a "dark day in the history of the U.N." when 22 humanitarian workers lost their lives in a terrorist attack in Iraq on August 19, 2003, adding that the event and the World Humanitarian Day both honor those lost lives and encourage others to join the effort. He further interviewed guests whose relatives lost their lives in the accident. Under-Secretary-General for Humanitarian Affairs and Emergency Relief Coordinator Valerie Amos also appeared encouraging everyone to log on to the website WHD-IWasHere.org by August 19 and commit to doing one good act to help someone in need further saying, "I told Beyoncé: It's great that we have her, because she can reach millions of people. I could spend the rest of my life doing what I do, and I wouldn't reach a 10th of that number. And she said: 'Don't sell yourself short.'.

Beyoncé appeared on stage wearing a floor-length white gown with micro-sequins from designer Marc Bouwer's pre-fall collection while her hair was pulled back in a sleek ponytail. She performed on a high-rise stage with a big screen spanning from ceiling to floor behind her. As she sang, the screen filled with images of U.N. aid workers on the scene in various wars, famines, and floods around the world. Following the performance, she announced, "I'd like to ask everyone to make sure they're a part of August 19th... It's such a beautiful, beautiful day, and I'd like to honor the 22 people who lost their lives. God bless you all. Thank you so much for having me." The music video for the song starts with Beyoncé singing the song with the U.N. audience seated in front of her, and images from recent disasters screening in panoramic view behind her. As the song progresses, scenes of globes and constellations turn up; laser lights and a small blue arrow, imprinted with the song's title, trace a path along the globe. The performance footage is also mixed with images of global volunteer efforts; as the giant screen displays globe-reaching graphics they morph into pictures of humanitarian work. The music video ends with the question "What Will You Do?" and offers the official website for the World Humanitarian Day.

=== Reception ===
Following Beyoncé's performance, American journalist Anderson Cooper who was present at the Hall and served as a host jokingly asked the crowd, "Is this what happens at the U.N. every Friday night? Because, I've gotta tell you ... I wanna be here every Friday night if this goes on." Diane Warren described the performance as "one of the best experiences ever" in her life. The performance and the music video received positive reviews from critics, who praised Beyoncé's live vocals. Pamela Falk of CBS News described the performance as "breathtaking" and "stunning". Jim Farber of Daily News was also positive about the performance saying that she "delivered a powerful live vocal to the song's musical track". Molly O'Brien of Prefix Magazine commented that the video was "simple and powerful: Beyoncé gives an impeccable live performance of the song... On the album, 'I Was Here' is pompous and a little cloying; live and accompanied by those images, it's got the same change-the-world flavor as Michael Jackson's 'Man in the Mirror.'" Nadeska Alexis of the same publication wrote that Beyoncé belted out her vocals while members of the audience sang along further noting that the moment ended "all too quickly". A writer of OK! magazine praised Beyoncé for being "striking as always" while belting out "I Was Here" in the video. MTV Act's Jose Iniguez described the performance as "phenomenal, flawless, goosebump-inducing, inspiring" adding that it gave him life and made him feel "gobbled up" by the presence of Beyoncé. He added that "I Was Here" couldn't have been a better fit for the campaign and concluded that "Bey[oncé] was simply flawless. Her voice, her dress, her touching (yet short) address after her performance sent chills down very limb."

Leslie Gornstein of E! Online praised Beyoncé's dress worn during the video, writing that "[it] reminds us of a long column of light". Lisa Potter from Marie Claire described the floor-length gown as "dramatic". A writer of MTV News also praised Beyoncé's "glamorous [look] in white". A writer of Rap-Up wrote in his review that the singer was "glowing" in her white dress, adding that she put her "powerful pipes on display as she belted out the empowering ballad". E! Online's Sierra Marquina described Beyoncé's look as "stunning". Melissa Maerz of Entertainment Weekly described the gown as "sleek, space-age white" and further praised Beyoncé for "belting out" the song emotionally with tears, comparing it with the live video from Live at Roseland: Elements of 4. Adelle Platon of Vibe magazine praised Beyoncé's look in a "stunning" white gown "belting against a backdrop of worldly images". Jason Lipshutz of Billboard wrote that the images of global volunteer efforts during the video were "striking". Peter Kirn from Create Digital Motion commented that the powerful projection used in the video "can make imagery big enough that it invites big thinking — and debate". Kirn concluded that "In the end, you see a performance in which neither Beyoncé nor the imagery upstages the other – it's two powerful performances, not just one." The Huffington Post's Sarah Dean described the video as inspiring while "shining a spotlight on humanitarian work". On August 29, 2012, according to Thunderclap 1.13 billion messages were shared worldwide. The video was nominated in the category for Best Video with a Social Message at the 2013 MTV Video Music Awards on August 25 but lost to Macklemore's "Same Love".

The music video gained 98.69 million views with 847,000 likes on YouTube as of August 16, 2018.

== Live performances ==
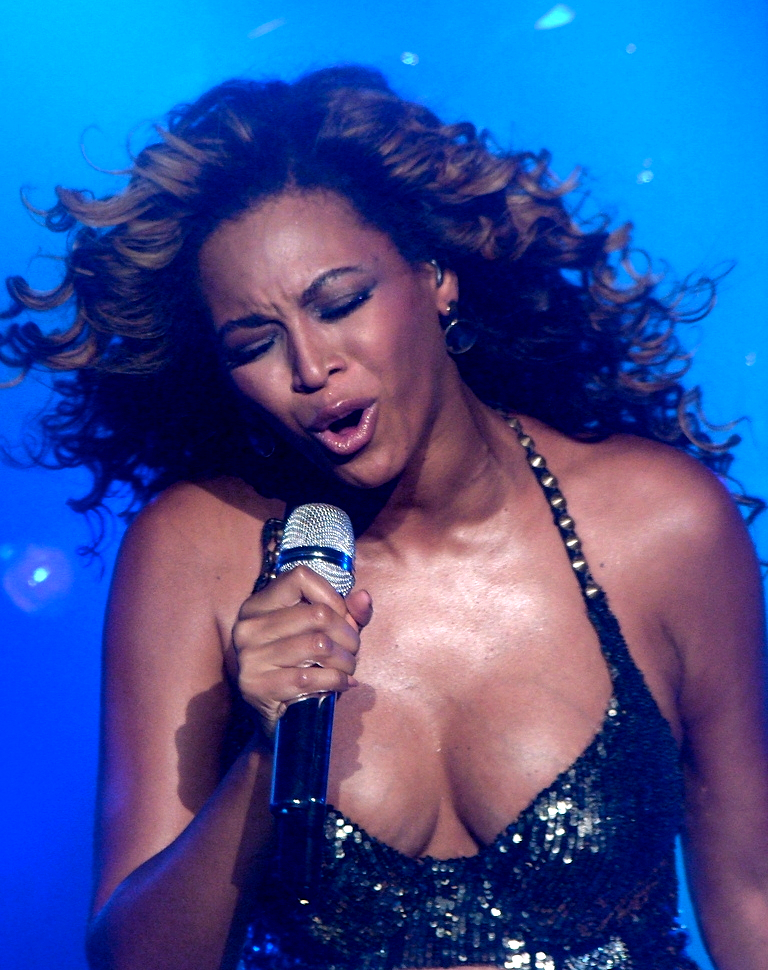
Beyoncé performing during the 4 Intimate Nights with Beyoncé.

Beyoncé performed "I Was Here" live for the first time on August 14, 2011, during her 4 Intimate Nights with Beyoncé in Roseland Ballroom, New York City. She performed the song in front of 3,500 people wearing a gold dress and backed by her all-female band and her backing singers, called the Mamas. "I Was Here" served as the closing song of the residency show with Beyoncé changing the line, on which the title of the song is based, to "Roseland, we were here." Jason Newman of Rap-Up magazine commented that "in less confident hands, the line would have come off as hokey. For Beyoncé, it was the recognition of a singular event before returning to the stadium." According to Brad Wete from Entertainment Weekly, during the performance of the song Beyoncé "bowed, fanatic screams and cheers followed."

Jody Rosen of Rolling Stone, who had given the song a negative review wrote that "on record, ['I Was Here'] was a hollow exercise in self-mythologizing. On Sunday night, though, Beyoncé brought the song to life, singing with a tenacious mix of shmaltz and soul that evoked two of her heroes, Barbra Streisand and Aretha Franklin [...] It sounded less like bluster than confession. It was almost intimate." Yolanda Sangweni of Essence magazine stated that ending the show with "I Was Here" was "triumphant note" and that "Diana Ross and Michael Jackson would be proud." During the ITV special A Night With Beyoncé which aired on December 4 in the United Kingdom, Beyoncé performed "I Was Here" to a selected crowd of fans. The performance from A Night With Beyoncé was later broadcast on Dick Clark's New Year's Rockin' Eve on December 31, 2011. A writer of Essence magazine noted that she performed a "powerful rendition" of the song further adding that she "looked and sounded glorious". In May 2012, during Revel Presents: Beyoncé Live, a video montage of Beyoncé holding her child Blue Ivy Carter, drinking a pint of Guinness, and going whale-watching was shown while the song was played in the background, before she began singing the first verse of Whitney Houston's "I Will Always Love You".

=== Live video ===
The live performance for "I Was Here" as part of 4 Intimate Nights with Beyoncé, where it served as the closing song, was taped and premiered online on November 16, 2011. It was added on the DVD Live at Roseland: Elements of 4, which was released in late November 2011. The video begins with Beyoncé onstage in a shimmery silver minidress, giving the crowd a bit of a windup about where "I Was Here" came from. She says: "It's taken a lot of hard work to get to where I am. I searched all around the world, and I found myself. You all are my inspiration. I want to sing this last song and dedicate it to all of you guys." The video then turns into a career retrospective in the form of Beyoncé's home movies and her professional highlights. It splices poignant memories throughout Beyoncé's life, from her childhood, to partying and vacations with her family, to most of the locations she visited around the world, to her rise with Destiny's Child into solo stardom and her love story with Jay-Z. Also containing footage from major performances and awards shows, the clip begins with a young Beyoncé thanking the judges in a talent show and later doing the snake in her living room, performing in her TLC-inspired neon overalls.

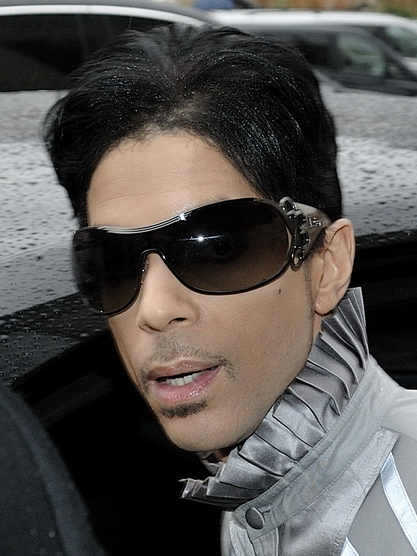
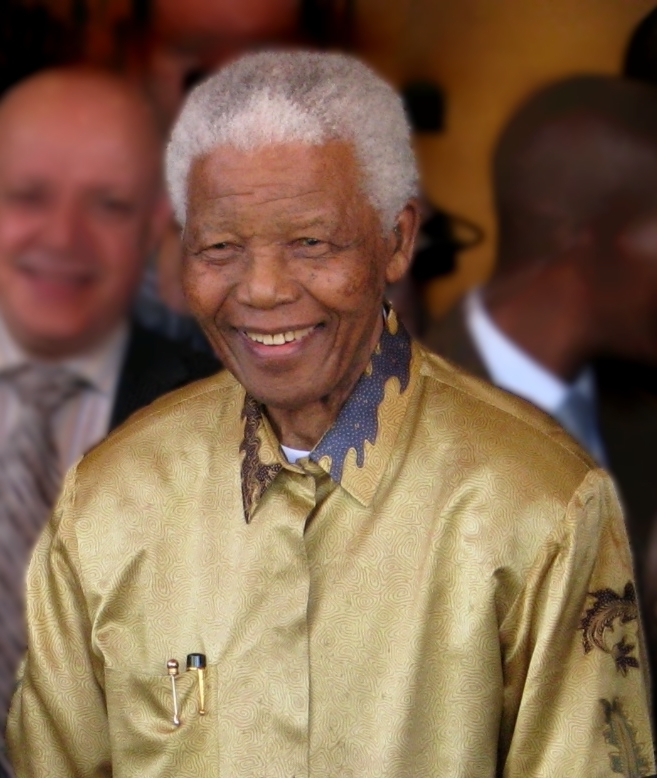
The live video of "I Was Here" from the DVD Live at Roseland: Elements of 4 featured appearances by Prince (left) and Nelson Mandela (right) among others.

The clip briefly returns to the center of the stage where Beyoncé starts to belt out the ballad over a montage of other home videos. It later shows Beyoncé, as an adult, hugging Michael Jackson, performing with Prince, Tina Turner, her husband, and contains cameos by Oprah Winfrey and Nelson Mandela. The montage additionally contains moments of the everyday behind-the-scenes footage of Beyoncé; her sometimes-awkward teenage hair, Beyoncé playing on a Slip 'n Slide, playing with her nephew in a pool, frolicking on a beach, going for whale watching, and trying on her actual wedding dress at the 3:36 mark. Other footage includes: Beyoncé performing on her world tours in support of her second and third studio albums, her performance at the 2011 Glastonbury Festival where she was the first major solo female headliner to appear on the Pyramid stage in over twenty years, a backstage scene of Beyoncé at the 52nd Grammy Awards, holding her six Grammy awards, which broke the record for most Grammy Awards won by a female artist in one night, The clip ends with Beyoncé revealing her baby bump on 2011 MTV Video Music Awards. a performance of "Run the World (Girls)" at the 2011 Billboard Music Awards, where she was given the Millennium Award for recognizing her career achievements and influence in the music industry.

Music critics generally welcomed the video as for most of her time in the spotlight, Beyoncé has been a strictly private celebrity. Melissa Maerz of Entertainment Weekly wrote that it was pleasant to see Beyoncé unguarded as it is a rare occurrence. He added that though the clip is a more professional-looking than most people's home movies, it remains the closest thing that fans have seen so far to "Bey[oncé] just being Bey[oncé]". Similarly, Brent Woodie of The Christian Post commented about how the 2008 wedding of Beyoncé to Jay-Z was kept very private; there were no photographs or videos released from the event, leaving media and gossip columnists to speculate on the nuptials. He welcomed the clip for being the first behind-the-scenes footage of Beyoncé on her wedding day. Luchina Fisher of ABC News described it as "a home movie featuring highlights from Beyonce's decorated life" and felt that it's "the personal moments [in the video] the singer's fans will no doubt devour". Samantha Cortez of Daily News felt that the content of the video which included Beyoncé's most personal moments and the lyrics of the song, "add even more sentiment to the video". At the 43rd NAACP Image Award presented on February 17, 2012, the video for "I Was Here" was nominated in the category for Outstanding Music Video.

== Cover versions ==
A cover version of "I Was Here" performed by Lea Michele was included on Glee's soundtrack album Glee: The Music, The Graduation Album released on May 14, 2012. On November 29, 2012, Diamond White, a contestant of the second season of The X Factor in the US covered "I Was Here". Michele Amabile Angermiller of The Hollywood Reporter noted that "Her performance had some pitch problems, but she pulled it out." Daniel Fienberg from the website HitFix wrote that she made a smart choice with the performance of the song adding that there were "some sharp notes here and there, but she sings her heart out". Bobby Olivier of The Star-Ledger described White's version as "pitchy" while Lisa de Moraes of The Washington Post wrote that she "blasts" through the song.

American Idol contestant Angela Miller performed the song during the twelfth season of the show in March 2013. Michael Slezak of the website TVLine graded the performance with B− saying that "tears may have affected the vocal a bit". Ericka Alston of Los Angeles Times wrote that Miller made "an appropriate choice" with the song.

On April 17, 2014, the song was performed live by Teodora Sava when she was 12 years old, as a special guest of the Romanian kids talent show Next Star.

In September 2014, Vanessa Hudgens covered "I Was Here" during the Voices On Point gala in Los Angeles held in support for LGBTQ students. She covered the song to honor Warren who received a Point Leadership Award at the event. Dutch singer Glennis Grace performed the song live on November 10, 2014, during the Dutch national memorial ceremony in front of over 1600 relatives of the victims of Malaysia Airlines Flight 17.

Coach Delta Goodrem performed the song with her artist Judah Kelly on the grand finale of the sixth season of The Voice Australia.

In 2020 Shirley Bassey recorded her version of the song with the Czech Studio Orchestra for her album I Owe It All to You. The album's release was teased with a lyric video of the song released via Bassey's official YouTube channel. The track was produced by Nick Patrick.

== Usage in media ==
On July 19, 2011, "I Was Here" provided the soundtrack for the 2011 FIFA Women's World Cup Final. As reported by ABC News on September 11, 2011, Beyoncé paid tribute to the September 11 attacks with "I Was Here" on the commemoration of the tenth anniversary of the event. On September 21, 2011, it was announced via PR Newswire that Boys & Girls Clubs of America (BGCA) would launch "a star-studded" new Public Service Advertising (PSA) campaign and that the soundtrack for the campaign would be "I Was Here". Nationwide, Boys & Girls Clubs provide high-impact, affordable programs, and caring adult mentors, to keep kids on the path to great futures, emphasizing academic success, good character and citizenship, and healthy lifestyles. The director, Ron Howard explained the reason behind choosing "I Was Here" as the soundtrack of their new PSA: "We wanted the most powerful piece of music possible, to underscore the dramatic message that what we do today to shape the future of our children is vitally important. We could not have picked a more moving track. Diane's words and Beyonce's delivery are over the top." In November 2013, the song was included on the relief album Songs for the Philippines; the proceeds of it were donated to the Philippine Red Cross for the victims of Typhoon Haiyan.

== Credits and personnel ==
Credits adapted from 4 liner notes.

- Beyoncé Knowles – vocals, vocal production
- Eric Aylands – assistant engineer
- Smith Carlson – assistant engineer
- Serban Ghenea – mixer
- John Hanes – mix engineer
- Kuk Harrell – vocal production, vocal recorder
- Brent Kutzle – additional programming, cello, guitar, piano, producer
- Phil Seaford – assistant mix engineer
- Jon Sher – assistant engineer
- Ryan Tedder – additional programming, background vocals, drums, producer
- Diane Warren – songwriter

== Charts ==
Chart (2011–12)	Peak position
Australian Singles Chart	85
Australian Urban Singles Chart	26
Belgium (Ultratip Bubbling Under Flanders)	18
CIS Airplay (TopHit)	187
Hungarian Singles Chart	6
Irish Singles Chart	88
Italy (FIMI)	93
Romania (Airplay 100)	100
South Korea International Singles Chart	44
Swiss Singles Chart	74
UK R&B Singles Chart	37
UK Singles Chart	131
US Dance Club Songs (Billboard)	13

== Certifications and sales ==
Region	Certification	Certified units/sales
Australia (ARIA)	Platinum	70,000^{‡}
Brazil (Pro-Música Brasil)	3× Platinum	180,000^{‡}
United Kingdom (BPI)	Silver	200,000^{‡}
United States (RIAA)	Gold	500,000^{‡}
^{‡} Sales+streaming figures based on certification alone.
