= Ray Gelato =

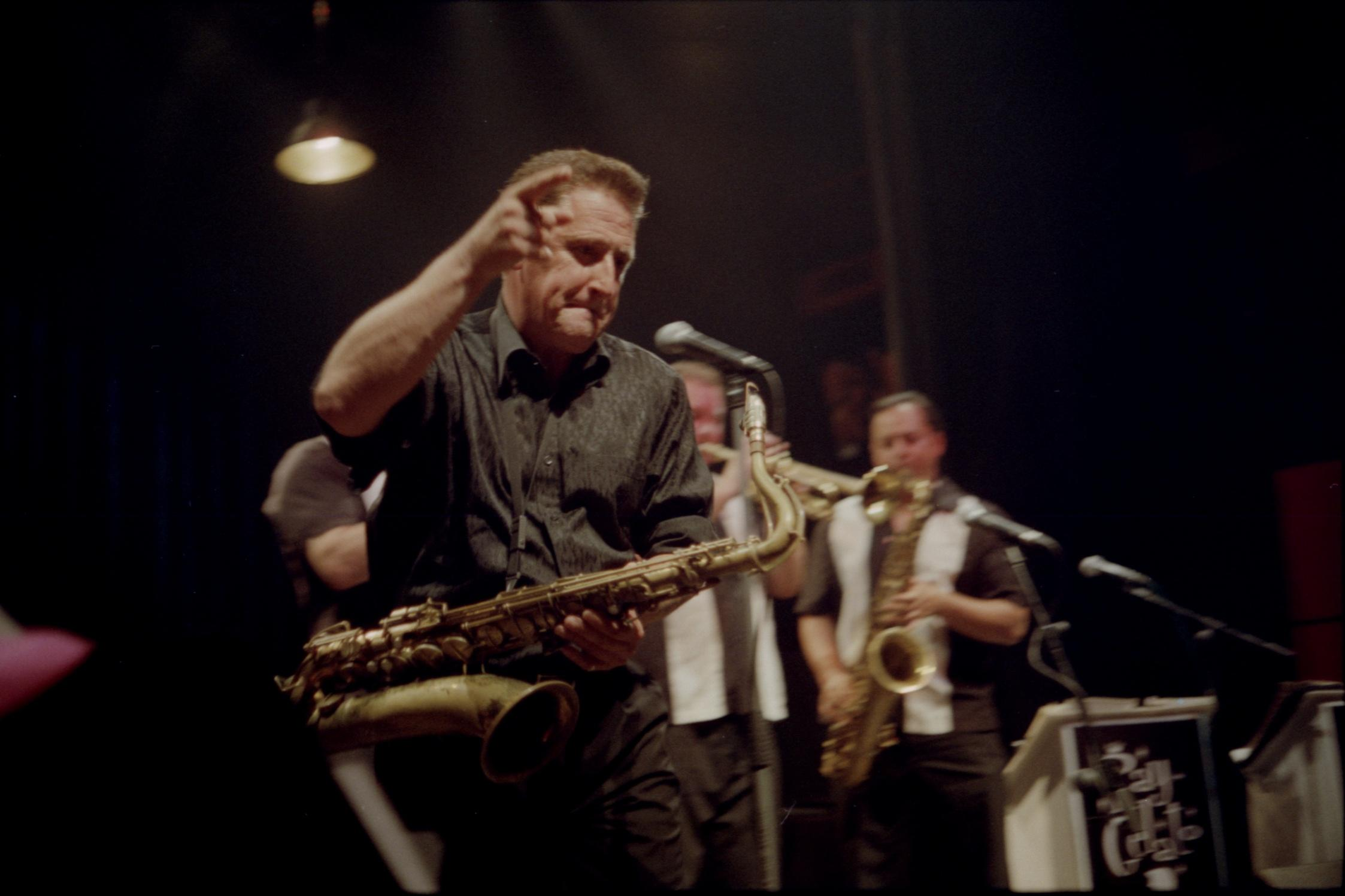

Background information
- Also known as: "The Godfather of Swing"
- Born: Ray Keith Irwin; 25 October 1961 (age 65); London, England
- Genres: Jazz; swing; Rock and roll; Jump blues
- Occupations: Saxophonist, singer, songwriter and bandleader
- Instruments: Tenor saxophone, vocals
- Years active: 1980s–present
- Website: Official website

Ray Keith Irwin (born 25 October 1961), known professionally by his stage name Ray Gelato, is a British jazz, swing and jump blues saxophonist, singer and bandleader. He is known as one of the major forces in the revival of swing music. Gelato has performed in a private capacity for Richard Branson, Paul McCartney and Elizabeth II amongst others.

AllMusic noted that "Gelato has been hugely successful, finding a niche and retaining his dominance in it through hard work, good musicianship and a flair for showmanship". Jools Holland meanwhile opined that "He plays what he means, and means what he plays".

== Life and career ==
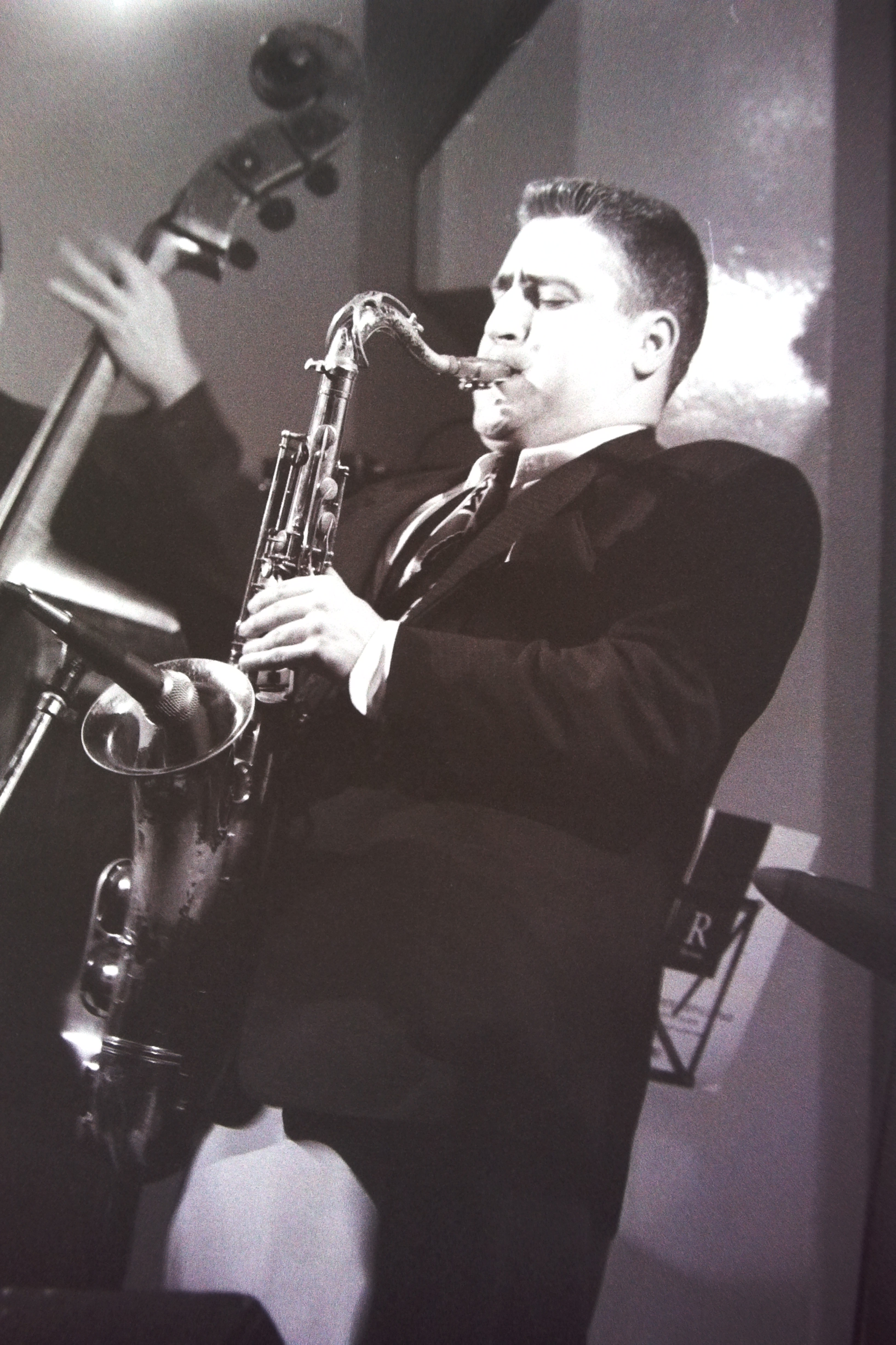
Ray Gelato, playing at the 100 Club (c. 1984)

Gelato is of Jewish ancestry, and was born in London, England, the son of a Jewish mother and an American soldier who was stationed in the UK. Through his father's record collection, Gelato heard the music of the swing bands of the 1940s, and the R&B and rock and roll prevalent in the 1950s. Music provided by Louis Jordan and Louis Prima proved inspirational, a love nurtured in his teens when Gelato visited local clubs to hear music played live. His admiration for the playing of Sam Butera led Gelato to commence learning to play the tenor saxophone at the age of 19, and he was sufficiently competent to begin playing semi-professionally the following year. By 1982, Gelato had teamed up with the French guitarist Patrice Serapiglia, and their small band became known as the Chevalier Brothers. Gelato gained his stage name around this time and, following success at a talent show held in London's Camden Palace, they appeared around the UK, and toured Europe and Japan playing their stylised swing revival music. The group played at the Montreux Jazz Festival, and the North Sea Jazz Festival, but by 1988 had disintegrated. Briefly working solo, Gelato then played and sang in the British film Scandal (1989), before forming Ray Gelato and the Giants of Jive. They played at Carnegie Hall, which was filmed in 1992 for Italian television. The group also recorded Gelato Express (1993), although they disbanded the following year.

In 1994, Gelato sang on the soundtrack for the BBC Television drama No Bananas, whilst forming a new outfit, the Ray Gelato Giants. They steered a more traditional course, with a repertoire incorporating the music of Nat King Cole, Duke Ellington, Dean Martin, and Frank Sinatra. They performed successfully at venues including the Umbria Jazz Festival in Italy, the Montreal Jazz Festival, San Sebastian Jazz Festival, and toured both Italy and the United States. Their popularity in Italy saw them appear on Maurizio Costanzo's television programme, and also play at Ronnie Scott's Jazz Club, and the 100 Club when back in London. In 1998, their music for a worldwide television commercial for Levi's meant a wide exposure for their version of "Tu Vuò Fà L'Americano", which appeared on both the albums The Men from Uncle (1998), and Live in Italy (2000). In addition, Gelato played the saxophone in his cameo role in the film Enigma (2001).

In 2002, they played at Paul McCartney's wedding to Heather Mills. In a busy year they also performed for Queen Elizabeth II at The Ritz Hotel, London, and played at the home of Richard Branson.

Gelato signed a new recording contract in 2004 and released Ray Gelato the same year. He also appeared on This Morning, singing his self-penned number "A Pizza You". Gelato also appeared at the 2004 Proms in the Park concert, alongside The Corrs and the BBC Symphony Orchestra, and later performed "It Don't Mean a Thing (If It Ain't Got That Swing)" on BBC One's Strictly Dance Fever. His self-penned number "Givin' Up Givin' Up" was incorporated into the soundtrack for the 2005 film The Perfect Man. In 2006, the band took part in one of their largest UK theatre tours to that point.

The band were the opening act in 2011 for Robbie Williams and his Swing When You're Winning concert at London's Royal Albert Hall, and performed at Bryan Adams' birthday party the same year. In 2015, Gelato released Wonderful, a collection of Italian songs, with Gelato singing mostly in Italian. It received four stars in a review by The Daily Telegraph.

Following George Melly's long-standing residency, Ronnie Scott's Jazz Club's Christmas seasonal slot was occupied in 2015 by Ray Gelato and the Giants. In 2016, Gelato and Claire Martin appeared at the Ribble Valley Jazz Festival, promoting their joint album, We've Got a World That Swings, which was released by Linn Records. In 2026, Gelato appeared as a contestant on the fourteenth series of The Voice UK where he performed his song "A Pizza You". Kelly Rowland and Tom Fletcher & Danny Jones turned their chairs, he selected Rowland to be his coach.

== Discography ==
=== Albums ===
Year	Title	Record label	Credited to
1989	Giants of Jive	Blue Horizon	Ray Gelato's Giants of Jive
1993	Gelato Espresso	Durium Records	Ray Gelato and the Giants of Jive
1997	Gangsters of Swing	Durium Records	Ray Gelato Meets The Good Fellas
1998	The Full Flavour	Linn Records	The Ray Gelato Giants
1998	The Men From Uncle	Double Scoop Records	The Ray Gelato Giants
2000	Live in Italy	Double Scoop Records	The Ray Gelato Giants
2001	The Ice Cream Man (compilation)	Double Scoop Records	Ray Gelato
2002	Smokin'	Double Scoop Records	The Ray Gelato Giants
2003	Gelato All'italiana	Durium Records	Ray Gelato Meets The Good Fellas
2004	Ray Gelato	T2 Records	Ray Gelato
2006	Hey There	Double Scoop Records	Ray Gelato
2008	Ray Gelato Salutes The Great Entertainers	Double Scoop Records	Ray Gelato
2011	Hey Boy! Hey Girl!	Double Scoop Records	The Ray Gelato Giants and Kai Hoffman
2012	Wonderful	Double Scoop Records	Ray Gelato and the Giants
2015	Original Flavours	Double Scoop Records	Ray Gelato and the Giants
2016	We've Got a World That Swings	Linn Records	Ray Gelato and Claire Martin
2017	The Italian Song Collection	Double Scoop Records	Ray Gelato
2019	The Big Sound - Live In London	Double Scoop Records	Ray Gelato and the Giants
