= The Voice UK series 14 =

The Voice UK
- Series 14
- Promotional poster featuring coaches D. Jones, will.i.am, Rowland, T. Jones, and Fletcher
- Hosted by: Emma Willis
- Coaches: will.i.am; Kelly Rowland; Sir Tom Jones; Tom Fletcher & Danny Jones
- Winner: Cate McHugh
- Winning coach: Sir Tom Jones
- Runners-up: Frank Raven; Monique Nicholson-Porter; Naná Aldrin-Quaye
- No. of episodes: 10

Release
- Original network: ITV1
- Original release: 22 August – 31 October 2026

Series chronology
- ← Previous; Series 13

The Voice UK is a British television music competition to find new singing talent. The fourteenth series premiered on 22 August 2026 on ITV1. Emma Willis returned to present the series, whilst will.i.am, Sir Tom Jones, and Tom Fletcher & Danny Jones returned as coaches. Former The Voice Australia coach Kelly Rowland debuted as a coach this series, replacing LeAnn Rimes.

On 31 October 2026, Cate McHugh was announced the winner of the series, marking Tom Jones' fourth and final win as a coach. This made Tom Jones the only coach to win four times on The Voice UK. Additionally, McHugh was the second visually impaired artist to win an entire series of The Voice, globally, following Andrea Begley, who won the second series. She is also the fifth winner in the show's history (after Jermain Jackman, Ruti Olajugbagbe, Blessing Chitapa and Craig Eddie) to have only received one-chair turn in the blind auditions.

== Overview ==
=== Coaches and host ===
Coaches and host for series 14 of The Voice UK

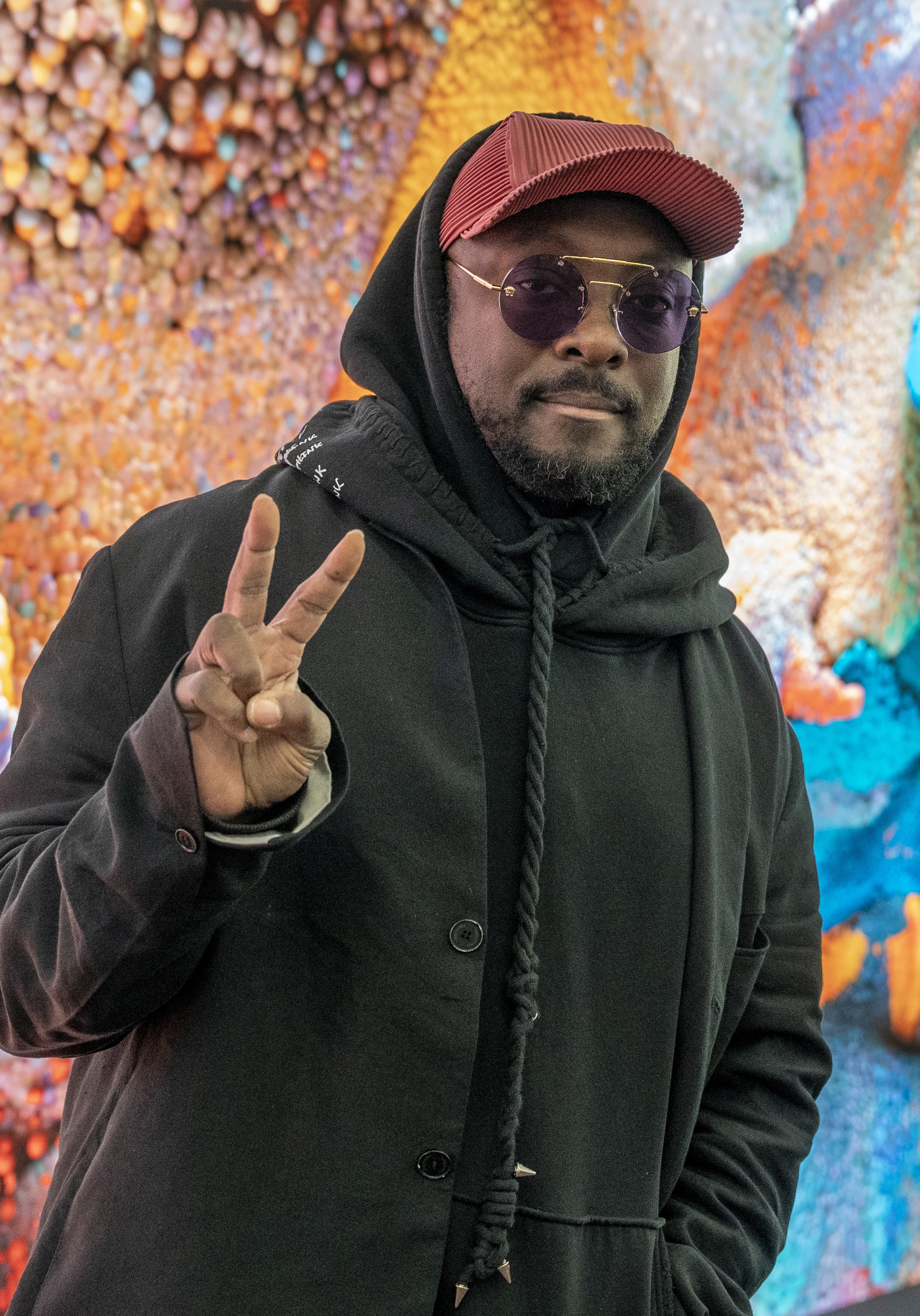
will.i.am

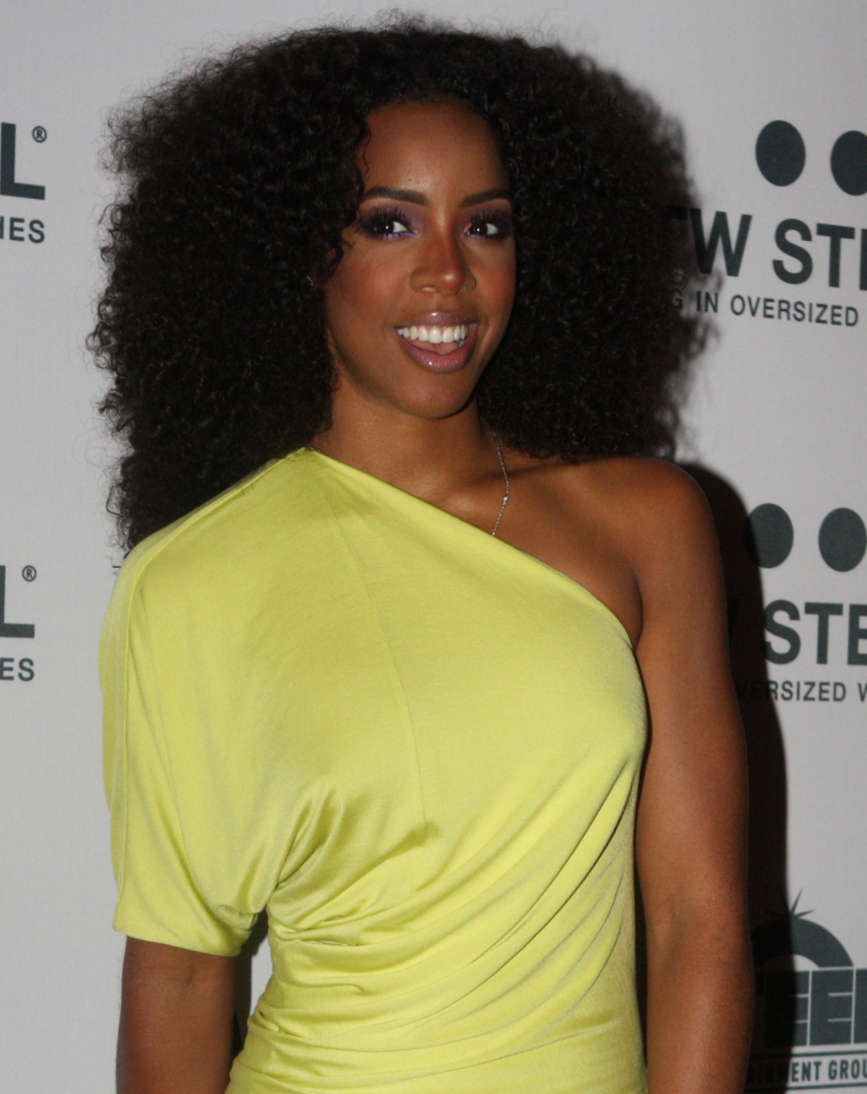
Kelly Rowland

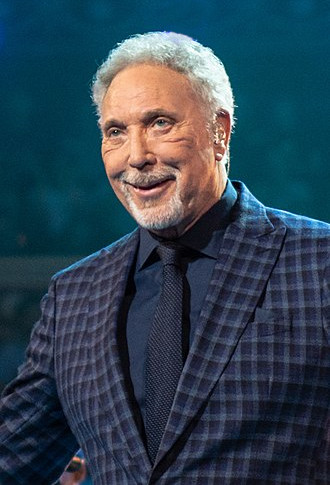
Sir Tom Jones

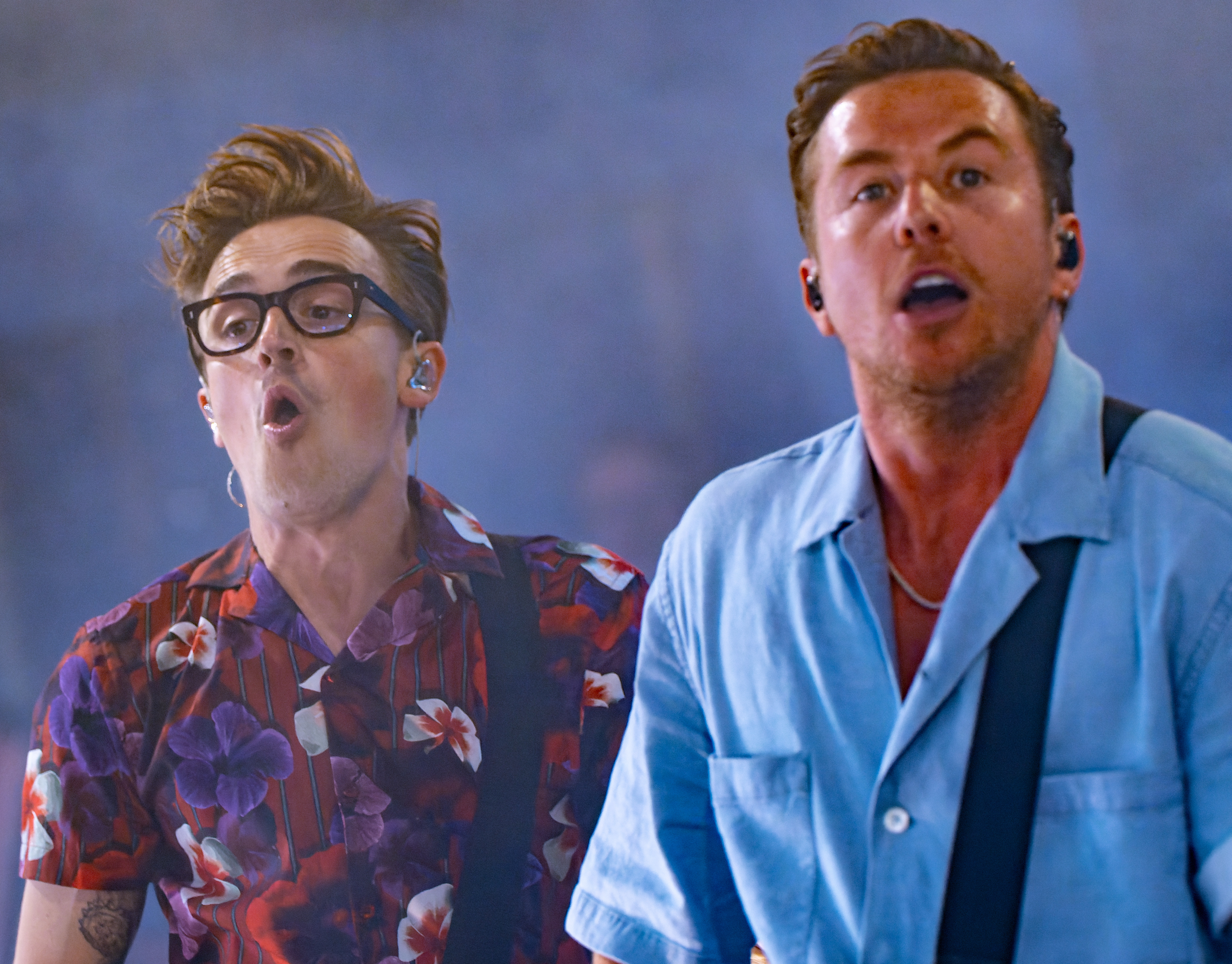
Tom Fletcher & Danny Jones

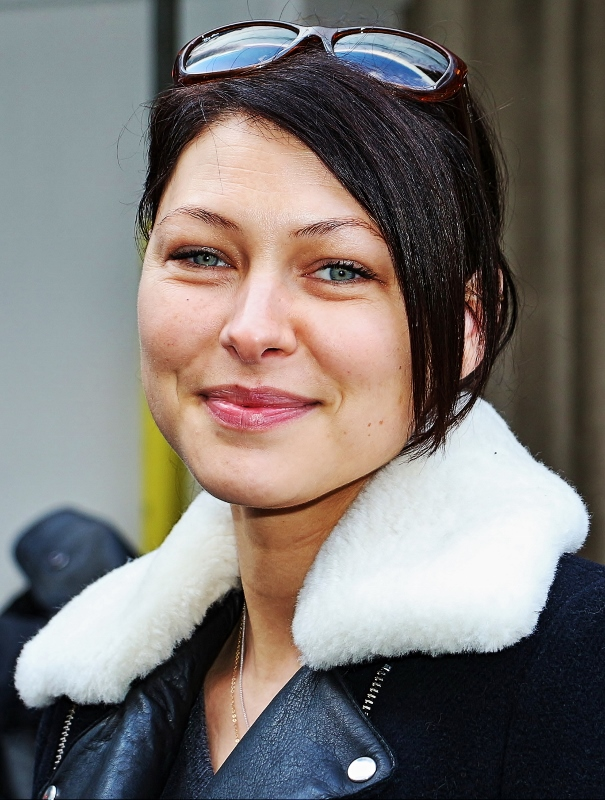
Emma Willis (host)

On 3 May 2025, it was announced that of the previous edition's four coaches, will.i.am, Sir Tom Jones, and Tom Fletcher & Danny Jones would return for their fourteenth, thirteenth, and second series, respectively. LeAnn Rimes subsequently announced her departure from the panel, and the following month, it was announced that Kelly Rowland would debut on the panel as her replacement. Emma Willis returned for her twelfth series as presenter.

In June 2026, it was hinted that duo coaches Tom Fletcher and Danny Jones might not return for the following series. It was later confirmed by ITV in September 2026 that Fletcher and Jones would not return to the show.

In September 2026, Sir Tom Jones confirmed that he would not return as a coach for series 15, having been "fired" by ITV as part of an effort to "refresh" the show. Jones stated that he did not want to leave, adding that "there's never a good time to fire an 86-year-old who's still pretty good at his job".

It was also announced that Willis would not return for the fifteenth series after serving as the presenter for twelve series. Her departure came after she landed the role as presenter of Strictly Come Dancing.

=== Guest advisors ===
The guest advisors for the Battles were revealed on 27 September 2026 as: upcoming coach Cheryl for Team Will, former The Voice Australia coach Delta Goodrem for Team Kelly, former coach Paloma Faith for Team Tom and fellow McFly bandmates Dougie Poynter and Harry Judd for Team Tom & Danny.

== Production ==
Auditions for the fourteenth series began taking place throughout June and July 2025. In June 2025, it was announced that the show would not air in autumn 2025 and would instead would return at a later date in 2026, skipping its annual autumn slot (held since series 11). However, the show was pushed backed a second time with ITV announcing that the show will launch in the summer.

This year the callbacks were axed and were replaced by the battles which last took place in series 10. On 6 August 2026, ITV released the first trailer for the series. This series featured the introduction of the "Rewind" twist, which gave the coaches the opportunity to bring an artist back if they had failed to turn for them.

== Teams ==
Colour key

- Winner
- Runner-up
- Eliminated in the Semi-Final
- Eliminated in the Battles
- Withdrew

Coach	Top 32 Artists			
will.i.am				
will.i.am	Naná Aldrin-Quaye	Diogo Ferreira	Sonna Rele	Ardú
will.i.am	Bella Popera	BMG	Teodora Sava	Triple Threat
Kelly Rowland				
Kelly Rowland	Monique Nicholson-Porter	Aaren James	Lascel Wood	Jessica Beth Bergman
Kelly Rowland	Ray Gelato	Cris Quammie	Turah Sadiq	Samantha Udeke
Sir Tom Jones				
Sir Tom Jones	Cate McHugh	Amália Estradas	Molly J	Eric & Jensen
Sir Tom Jones	Harry Linacre	Dakari Love	Robbie McMinn	Vadé
Tom Fletcher & Danny Jones				
Tom Fletcher & Danny Jones	Frank Raven	Jack Algar	Ciiara Nyx	Ross McGuire
Tom Fletcher & Danny Jones	Finlay McKillop	Regan Preece	Adam Tucker	Ellie Harney
Bold names are recipients of the rewind.

== Blind auditions ==
The Blind Auditions began on 22 August 2026. During each audition, each artist performs in front of the coaches, who have their chairs faced towards the audience. If a coach is interested in having the artist on their team, they can press their button to face the artist. If only one coach presses their button, the artist is defaulted to their team; however, if multiple coaches press their button, the choice is given to the artist who elects a coach after each turned coach has pitched.

New this season, each coach has a "rewind" to save an artist from elimination. will.i.am and Sir Tom Jones did not use their rewind. Each coach ends up with 8 artists by the end of the blind auditions, creating a total of 32 artists advancing to the battles.

Blind auditions colour key
✔	Coach pressed "I WANT YOU" button
	Artist defaulted to this coach's team
	Artist elected to join this coach's team
	Artist was originally eliminated with no coach pressing their button, but was saved by the "Rewind"
	Artist eliminated with no coach pressing their "I WANT YOU" button
	Artist received an "All Turn"

=== Episode 1 (22 August) ===
- Coach performance: Kelly Rowland & Sir Tom Jones — "Fever"

Order	Artist	Age	Song	Coaches and artists choices			
Order	Artist	Age	Song	will.i.am	Kelly	Tom J.	Tom F. & Danny
1	Ellie Harney	24	"Idontwannabeyouanymore"	—	✔	✔	✔
2	Cate McHugh	31	"Die with a Smile"	—	—	✔	—
3	Katie Mittell^{1}	42	"Wicked Game"	—	—	—	—
4	Monique Nicholson-Porter	32	"POV"	✔	✔	✔	✔
5	Ray Gelato	63	"A Pizza You" (original song)	—	✔	—	✔
6	Diogo Ferreira	27	"All I Want"	✔	✔	✔	✔

^1 Katie Mittell previously auditioned in both series of the Welsh version, she did not manage a chair turn on the first series, and was eliminated in the semi-finals during the second series.

=== Episode 2 (29 August) ===
- Coach performance: Sir Tom Jones — "Tower of Song"

Order	Artist	Age	Song	Coaches and artists choices			
Order	Artist	Age	Song	will.i.am	Kelly	Tom J.	Tom F. & Danny
1	Vadé (Roy, Jermaine, Joseph, JJ and Phil)	33–42	"Kiss from a Rose"	—	—	✔	—
2	Ross McGuire	23	"One Life"	—	—	—	✔
3	Kieran the Chanter	25	"Mamma Mia"	—	—	—	—
4	Amália Estradas	22	"Lonely"	✔	—	✔	✔
5	Sonna Rele	40	"My All"	✔	✔	—	✔
6	Kay-Lee Equeall	26	"The Night We Met"	—	—	—	—
7	Lascel Wood^{2}	34	"I Know Where I've Been"	✔	✔	✔	✔

^2 Lascel Wood previously auditioned in front of Rowland during the eighth series of The X Factor.

=== Episode 3 (5 September) ===
- Coach performance: Kelly Rowland — "When Love Takes Over"

Order	Artist	Age	Song	Coaches and artists choices			
Order	Artist	Age	Song	will.i.am	Kelly	Tom J.	Tom F. & Danny
1	BMG (Chidi, Kingxton, Bubu)	30–33	"Badman" (original song)	✔	✔	—	✔
2	Ciiara Nyx	19	"Glory Box"	—	✔	—	✔
3	Grace Kennedy	67	"Nutbush City Limits"	—	—	—	—
4	Rosie Botham	24	"A Sunday Kind of Love"	—	—	—	—
5	Finlay McKillop	26	"The Music of the Night"	—	—	—	✔
6	Harry Linacre	30	"Sweet Dreams"	—	—	✔	—
7	Aaren James	24	"How Do I Say Goodbye"	—	✔	✔	—

=== Episode 4 (12 September) ===
- Coach performance: Tom Fletcher & Danny Jones — "Shine a Light"

Order	Artist	Age	Song	Coaches and artists choices			
Order	Artist	Age	Song	will.i.am	Kelly	Tom J.	Tom F. & Danny
1	Cris Quammie	43	"Try a Little Tenderness"	✔	✔	✔	—
2	Triple Threat	25–46	"More Than That" (original song)	✔	✔	—	—
3	Jack Algar	17	"House of the Rising Sun"	—	—	—	✔
4	Tiffany Bell	31	"Leave the Door Open"	—	—	—	—
5	Matt McClafferty	28	"Unlucky in Love" (original song)	—	—	—	—
6	Eric & Jensen	24 & 20	"Ain't Far From It"	—	—	✔	—
7	Teodora Sava	23	"Oscar Winning Tears"	✔	✔	✔	✔

=== Episode 5 (19 September) ===
- Coach performance: Sir Tom Jones — "It's Not Unusual"

Order	Artist	Age	Song	Coaches and artists choices			
Order	Artist	Age	Song	will.i.am	Kelly	Tom J.	Tom F. & Danny
1	Naná Aldrin-Quaye	39	"I Will Survive" (in Spanish)	✔	✔	✔	✔
2	Samantha Udeke	20	"Open Arms"	—	✔	—	—
3	Frank Raven	17	"West Coast"	—	—	—	✔
4	Kacey-Leigh	20	"Elastic Heart"	—	—	—	—
5	Dakari Love	27	"No Time to Die"	—	—	✔	—
6	Latyno BBI	23	"X"	—	—	—	—
7	Ardú	27–34	"Anxiety" / "Somebody That I Used to Know"	✔	—	—	—
8	Molly J	29	"Dangerously in Love"	✔	✔	✔	—

=== Episode 6 (3 October) ===
Order	Artist	Age	Song	Coaches and artists choices			
Order	Artist	Age	Song	will.i.am	Kelly	Tom J.	Tom F. & Danny
1	Regan Preece	18	"Something in the Orange"	—	—	✔	✔
2	Nikko	33	"Temperature" (original song)	—	—	—	—
3	Turah Sadiq	21	"When You Believe"	—	✔	—	—
4	Bella Popera (Julia, Ciara and Eleanor)	31–34	"La donna è mobile"	✔	—	—	—
5	Robbie McMinn	19	"If You Love Her"	Team Full	—	✔	—
6	Jessica Beth Bergman	30	"Pink Pony Club"	Team Full	✔	Team Full	—
7	Jeanette Akua	33	"Stay"	Team Full	Team Full	Team Full	—
8	Adam Tucker	30	"Feel"	Team Full	Team Full	Team Full	✔

== Battles ==
Guest mentors for series 14 of The Voice UK

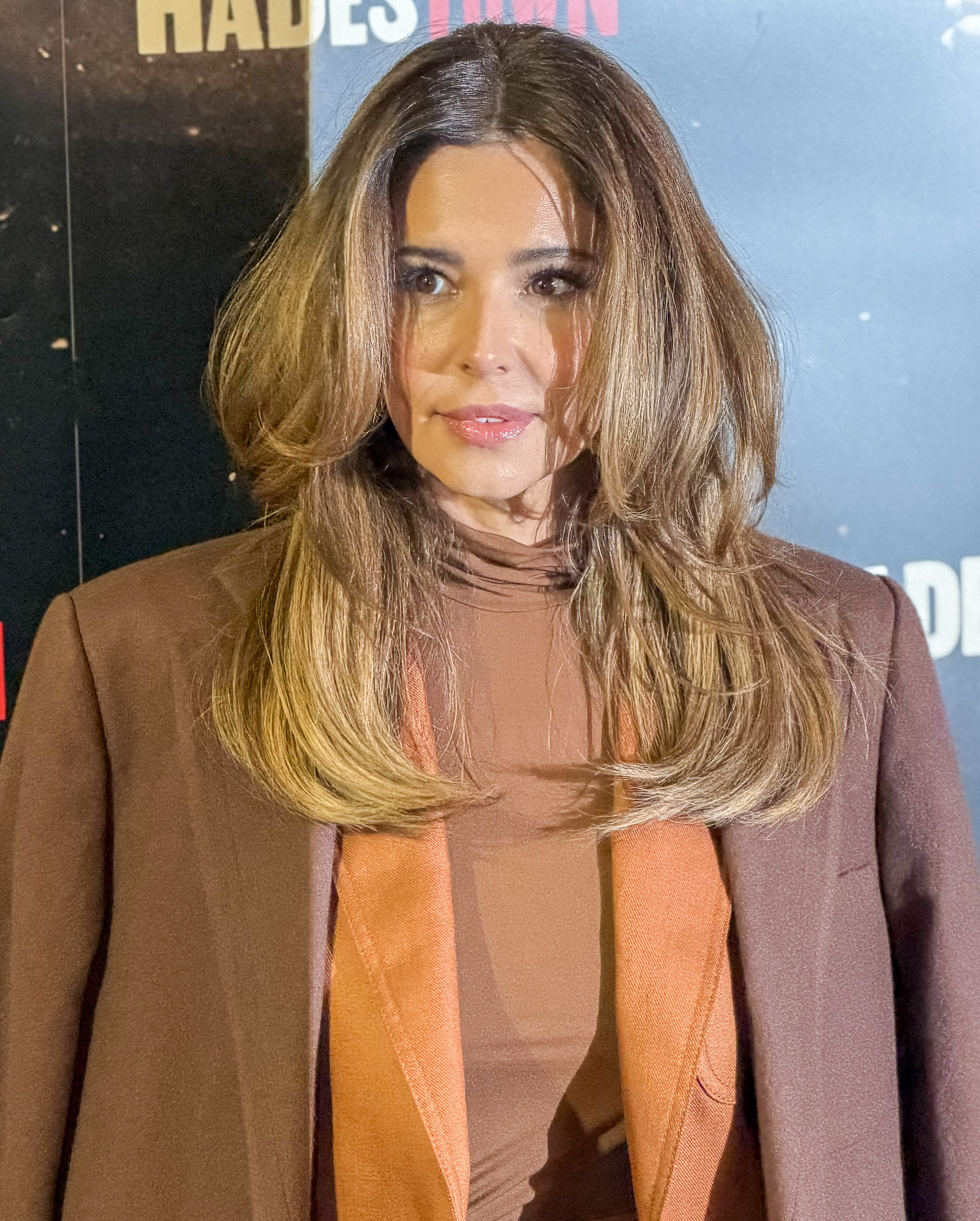
Cheryl for Team Will

Delta Goodrem for Team Kelly

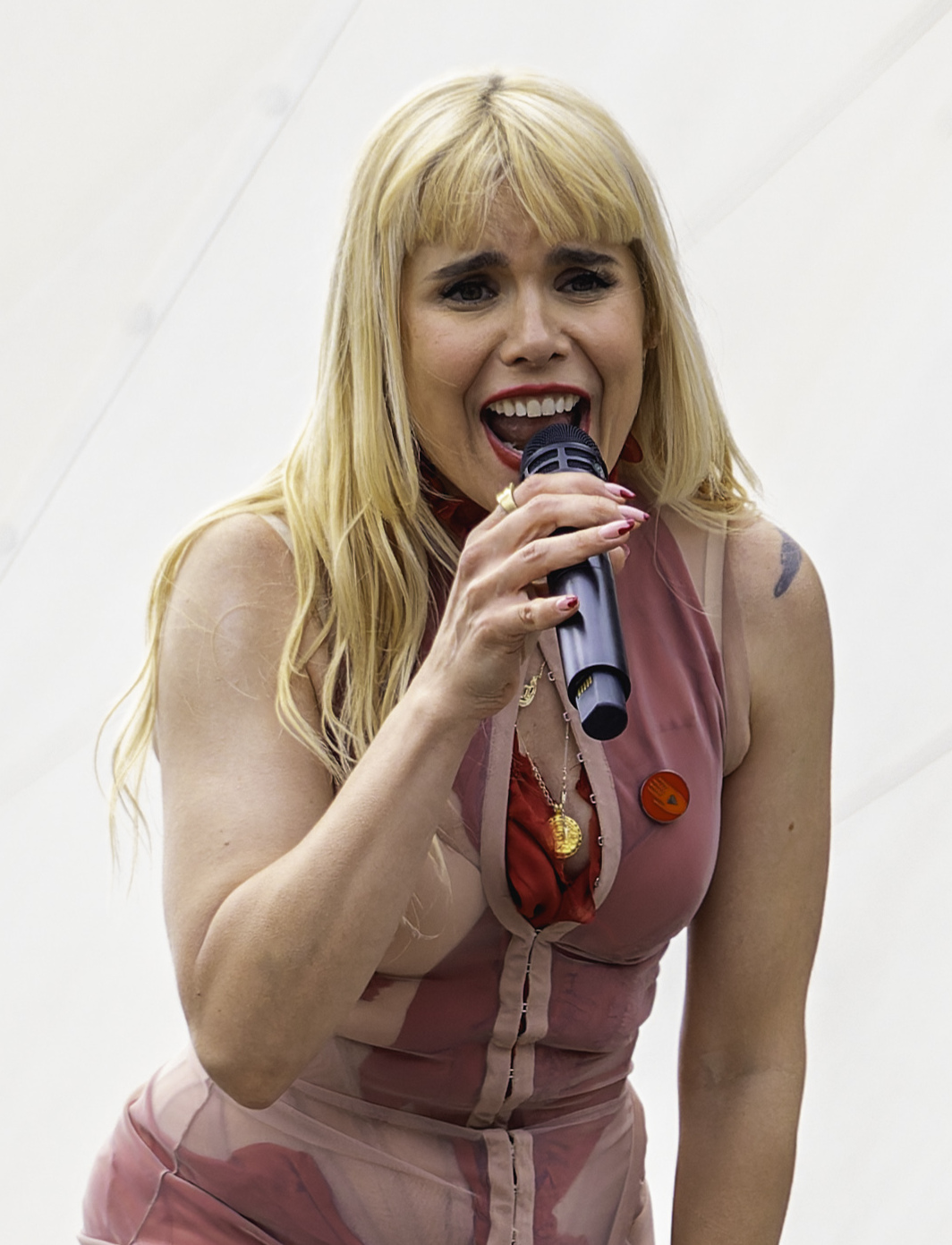
Paloma Faith for Team Tom

Dougie Poynter for Team Tom & Danny

Harry Judd for Team Tom & Danny

The Battles returned after last being present in the tenth series. This series, the battles took place in a private room, without an audience, each coach had their own celebrity advisor to help them make their decisions. Team Will had upcoming coach Cheryl, Team Kelly had former The Voice Australia colleague Delta Goodrem, Team Tom had former coach Paloma Faith, and Team Tom & Danny had McFly bandmates Dougie Poynter and Harry Judd.

Teams Will and Tom performed in the first episode while Teams Kelly and Tom & Danny performed in the next.

After each battle each coach, with the help of their advisor(s), decides three acts to advance to the semi-final, meaning coaches can opt to directly advance or eliminate both artists in the battle, or choose one from the battle to advance.

Battle rounds colour key
Artist advanced to the semi-finals
Artist was eliminated

=== Episode 7 (10 October) ===
Order	Coach	Artists		Song
1	will.i.am	Sonna Rele	Teodora Sava	"Bad Dreams"
2	will.i.am	Diogo Ferreira	Triple Threat	"A Bar Song (Tipsy)"
3	will.i.am	Naná Aldrin-Quaye	BMG	"Suavemente"
4	will.i.am	Bella Popera	Ardú	"Home"
5	Sir Tom Jones	Harry Linacre	Vadé	"End of the Road"
6	Sir Tom Jones	Amália Estradas	Robbie McMinn	"Good Luck, Babe!"
7	Sir Tom Jones	Cate McHugh	Eric & Jensen	"You Can Never Tell"
8	Sir Tom Jones	Molly J	Dakari Love	"Against All Odds"

=== Episode 8 (17 October) ===
Ellie Harney from Team Tom & Danny withdrew from the competition prior to the battles, therefore Frank Raven sang solo.

Order	Coach	Artist(s)		Song
1	Kelly Rowland	Aaren James	Samantha Udeke	"Lose Control"
2	Kelly Rowland	Turah Sadiq	Jessica Beth Bergman	"Get Here"
3	Kelly Rowland	Cris Quammie	Ray Gelato	"For Once in My Life"
4	Kelly Rowland	Lascel Wood	Monique Nicholson-Porter	"You're All I Need to Get By"
5	Tom Fletcher & Danny Jones	Jack Algar	Adam Tucker	"Iris"
6	Tom Fletcher & Danny Jones	Ross McGuire	Regan Preece	"Stargazing"
7	Tom Fletcher & Danny Jones	Ciiara Nyx	Finlay McKillop	"She Used to Be Mine"
8	Tom Fletcher & Danny Jones	Frank Raven		"Please Please Please"

== Show details ==
=== Results summary ===
Colour key

Team Will
Team Kelly
Team Tom
Team Tom & Danny

Result's colour key
Artist received the most public votes
Artist was eliminated

Weekly results
Contestant	Week 1	Week 2
Cate McHugh	Safe	Winner
Frank Raven	Safe	Finalist
Monique Nicholson-Porter	Safe	Finalist
Naná Aldrin-Quaye	Safe	Finalist
Aaren James	Eliminated	Eliminated (Week 1)
Amália Estradas	Eliminated	Eliminated (Week 1)
Ciiara Nyx	Eliminated	Eliminated (Week 1)
Diogo Ferreira	Eliminated	Eliminated (Week 1)
Jack Algar	Eliminated	Eliminated (Week 1)
Lascel Wood	Eliminated	Eliminated (Week 1)
Molly J	Eliminated	Eliminated (Week 1)
Sonna Rele	Eliminated	Eliminated (Week 1)

=== Week 1: Semi-Final (24 October) ===
The semi-final aired on 24 October 2026. The 12 contestants who advanced from the Battles competed, with each coach having to select one artist out of three to take through to the final.

Semi-final performances and results
Order	Coach	Artist	Song	Result
1	Kelly Rowland	Lascel Wood	"Life On Mars?"	Eliminated
2	Kelly Rowland	Aaren James	"Ordinary"	Eliminated
3	Kelly Rowland	Monique Nicholson-Porter	"All the Man That I Need"	Saved
4	will.i.am	Naná Aldrin-Quaye	"Fever"	Saved
5	will.i.am	Sonna Rele	"Halo"	Eliminated
6	will.i.am	Diogo Ferreira	"Dreams"	Eliminated
7	Tom Fletcher & Danny Jones	Ciiara Nyx	"In the Name of Love"	Eliminated
8	Tom Fletcher & Danny Jones	Jack Algar	"Smooth"	Eliminated
9	Tom Fletcher & Danny Jones	Frank Raven	"Rebel Yell"	Saved
10	Sir Tom Jones	Amália Estradas	"Happier Than Ever"	Eliminated
11	Sir Tom Jones	Molly J	"A Song for You"	Eliminated
12	Sir Tom Jones	Cate McHugh	"Sign of the Times"	Saved

=== Week 2: Final (31 October) ===
- Coach performance: "I Want Your Love"
- Musical performance: Ella Eyre — "Hell Yeah"

The final aired on 31 October 2026. The 4 contestants who advanced by their coaches in the semi-final competed, with each artist singing a solo song and a duet with their respective coach. Like the past two series, the winner was decided by a studio audience.

At the end of the episode, Cate McHugh from team Tom was named winner.

Performances in the final episode
Order	Coach	Artist	Song	Order	Duet (with Coach)	Result
1	Kelly Rowland	Monique Nicholson-Porter	"Heal"	8	"Shackles (Praise You)"	Finalist
2	Tom Fletcher & Danny Jones	Frank Raven	"...Baby One More Time"	5	"Can't Take My Eyes Off You"	Finalist
3	will.i.am	Naná Aldrin-Quaye	"Hello"	6	"RITMO"	Finalist
4	Sir Tom Jones	Cate McHugh	"Blackbird"	7	"Take Me Home, Country Roads"	Winner

== Ratings ==
Official ratings are 28-day figures, include viewers watching on PC and mobile devices, and are taken from BARB.

Episode	Date	Official ratings
Blind auditions 1	22 August	2,653,300
Blind auditions 2	29 August	2,929,800
Blind auditions 3	5 September	2,570,600
Blind auditions 4	12 September	2,882,300
Blind auditions 5	19 September	
Blind auditions 6	3 October	
Battles 1	10 October	
Battles 2	17 October	
Semi-Final	24 October	
Final	31 October	
