= Teodora Sava =

Romanian singer (born 2001)

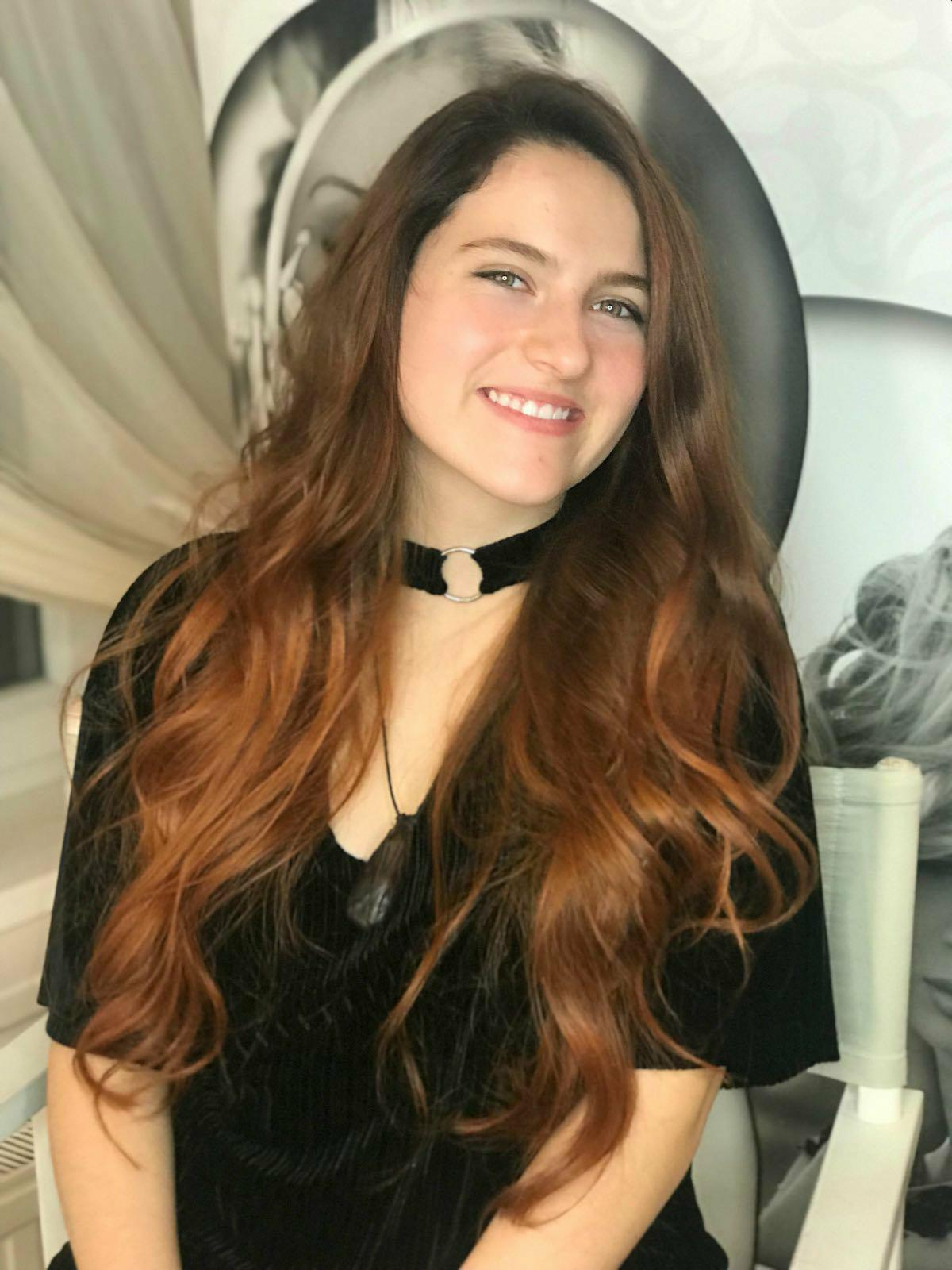

Background information
- Born: Teodora Sabina Sava; Piatra Neamț, Romania
- Genres: Pop; R&B; Jazz
- Occupation: Singer
- Instruments: Voice, piano, flute, guitar
- Years active: 2010–present

Teodora Sava (Romanian pronunciation: [te.oˈdora ˈsava]) is a Romanian singer who has appeared on several Antena 1 television shows, including the talent competitions Next Star and X Factor Romania, and has performed at numerous music festivals and televised events.

== Biography ==
Teodora Sava was born in Piatra Neamț, Romania. She recorded four songs in collaboration with Sister Monica at the Vincenzina Cusmano Foundation kindergarten, which were released on four CDs for children.

Sava continued her training at the Allegria Club under Professor Alina Apetrei and, beginning in November 2009, with Professor Cristina Cozma at the Children's Palace in Iași and Professor Lucian Sitaru at the Arts High School in Piatra Neamț. In 2010, with Sitaru’s “Camena” group, she received the Special Prize of TVR for best performance at Mamaia Copiilor and placed second at the Junior Golden Stag Festival.

Her first award was third place at the Fiero National Children's Music Festival in Bucharest in January 2010. Later that year, she participated in the Junior Golden Stag Festival, where she received the “Revelation of the Festival” prize from the judging panel, which included Mihai Trăistariu. Composer Dan Dimitriu invited her to perform several songs at the same competition.

She studied at Victor Brauner High School of Fine Arts in Piatra Neamț and later at George Enescu National College of Music in Bucharest, focusing on singing, piano, flute, and guitar. Sava has also studied acting, and in May 2017 appeared on stage at a youth theater festival in Suceava. She subsequently performed in theatrical productions, including the teen musical If We Love Each Other.

In 2017 she was enrolled at BIMM Institute in London, UK. Sava was a contestant on the seventh season of The X Factor Romania, which aired from September to December 2017, and finished in sixth place.

Sava has performed duets with Nico, Paula Seling, and the band Proconsul on the TV show Next Star, as well as with the band FREE STAY (led by Florin Ristei) on the TV show Te cunosc de undeva!.

Sava participated in the fourteenth series of the British talent show The Voice UK, where she performed "Oscar Winning Tears" by RAYE. She turned all four coaches' chairs and ultimately chose will.i.am as her coach. She was eliminated in the following round, the Battles, after performing "Bad Dreams" with Sonna Rele. Following her appearance on The Voice UK, Sava participated in the fourteenth series of Vocea României, where she again turned all four coaches' chairs and ultimately chose Horia Brenciu & Theo Rose as her coach.

== Musical and vocal performances ==
At age 12, Teodora Sava performed cover songs such as Listen and One Moment in Time on the Romanian television show Next Star (2013). Shortly afterward, she recorded her first original song, Belief.

Sava has performed on television shows and live events, including appearances on Te cunosc de undeva! and X Factor Romania (Season 7, 2017).

== Filmography (TV) ==
- X Factor (Romania) 2017 (season 7)
- TV show 'Neatza cu Răzvan și Dani (Antena 1 Romania)
- Antena 1 – Next Star: Season 1 – 2013 (runner-up), plus in other Special Editions that followed
- Antena 3 (Romania): Sinteza zilei
- Antena Stars: Răi da' buni
- Antena 1: Junior Chef
- Antena 1: Te cunosc de undeva!
- ZU TV: ZU Kids On the Block
- Național TV; Favorit TV; EST TV; Antena 1 Deva
- Several performances at TVR 3 in the show Țara lui Piticot
- Shows for kids at local TV stations from Piatra Neamț (TVM, 1TV, TeleM)
- Charity show "For you, children", held at Teatrul Tineretului Piatra Neamț in December 2009
- The Voice UK 2026 (series 14)

== Awards and nominations ==
Between the age of 8 and 11 years old, Teodora Sava participated in numerous festivals and contests in which she won a number of awards and trophies:

- Festival Liga Campionilor, Râșnov, July 2013 – place I
- Festival Trofeul Toamnei, Piatra Neamț, November 2012 – Trophy
- Festival Stea printre Stele, Bacău, November 2012 – place I Grand prize "Mihai Trăistariu”
- Festival Constelația Juniorilor, Focșani, October 2012 – place I
- Festival Așchiuță, Bacău, June 2012 – Trophy
- Festival Cununa Petrolului, Moreni, Dâmbovița, June 2012 – Trophy gr. 1
- Festival Vis de Stea, Moinești, June 2012 – Trophy
- Festival Mihaela Runceanu, Buzău, May 2012 – Trophy
- Festival Lucky Kids, Roman, April 2012 – Trophy
- Festival Femina, Bacău, 2012 – Trophy
- Festival Adantino, Bucharest, 2011 – Trophy
- Festival Neghiniță, Bacău, 2011 – Trophy
- Festival Cântec de Stea, Piatra Neamț, 2011 – place I
- Festival Music For Kids, Iași, 2011 – Kids Trophy
- Contest "Galeria Mall is looking for a star", Piatra Neamț, 2011 – place I
- Festival Farmecul muzicii, Năvodari, 2011 – Trophy gr. 1
- Festival Mamaia Copiilor, Constanța, 2011 – Press Award
- Festival Junior Golden Stag (Romanian Top Kids)", Bucharest, 2011 – Diploma
- Festival Music For Kids, Iași, June 2011 – place I category 8–10 years old
- Festival Portativul cu Steluțe, Ploiești, March 2011 – Trophy
- Festival Fulg de nea, Brașov, November 2010 – place I
- Festival Trofeul Toamnei, Piatra Neamț, November 2010 – place I
- Contest "Galeria Mall is looking for a star", Piatra Neamț, September 2010 – place I
- Festival Olimpiada copiilor, Bacău, May 2010 – place I
- Festival Liga Campionilor, Râșnov, August 2010 – Trophy category 8–10 years old
- Festival Camena, Piatra Neamț, June 2010 – Trophy category 5–8 years old
- Festival Trofeul Toamnei, Piatra Neamț, 2010 – Press Award
- Festival Steluțe de Mai, Focșani, 2010 – Melody Award
- Festival Camena, Piatra Neamț, 2010 – "Revelation of the Festival" award (Mihai Trăistariu)
- Microconcert within the Festival "Junior Golden Stag" 2010

== Songs performed ==
- 2021 – Never Enough by Teodora Sava
- 2021 – First by Teodora Sava
- 2017 – Alive by Sia performed live during X Factor Romania 2017, season 7
- 2017 – Listen by Beyoncé (X Factor Romania 2017, season 7)
- 2017 – Purple Rain by Prince (X Factor Romania 2017, season 7)
- 2017 – The Voice Within by Christina Aguilera (X Factor Romania 2017, season 7)
- 2017 – Firework by Katy Perry (X Factor Romania 2017, season 7)
- 2017 – Who's Lovin' You by Smokey Robinson (X Factor Romania 2017)
- 2017 – The Greatest by Sia
- 2017 – Nobody's Perfect by Jessie J (duet with Free Stay)
- 2016 – Stone Cold by Demi Lovato
- 2016 – Take Me to Church by Hozier
- 2016 – Lost on You by Laura Pergolizzi
- 2015 – Roar by Katy Perry
- 2015 – Halo by Beyoncé
- 2015 – I Don't Want to Miss a Thing by Aerosmith
- 2015 – If I Were a Boy by Beyoncé
- 2015 – When You Believe by Stephen Schwartz (duet with Nico)
- 2014 – La solitudine by Laura Pausini (duet with Paula Seling)
- 2014 – I Was Here by Beyoncé
- 2014 – All I Want for Christmas Is You by Mariah Carey
