= Vadé =

British a cappella R&B quintet

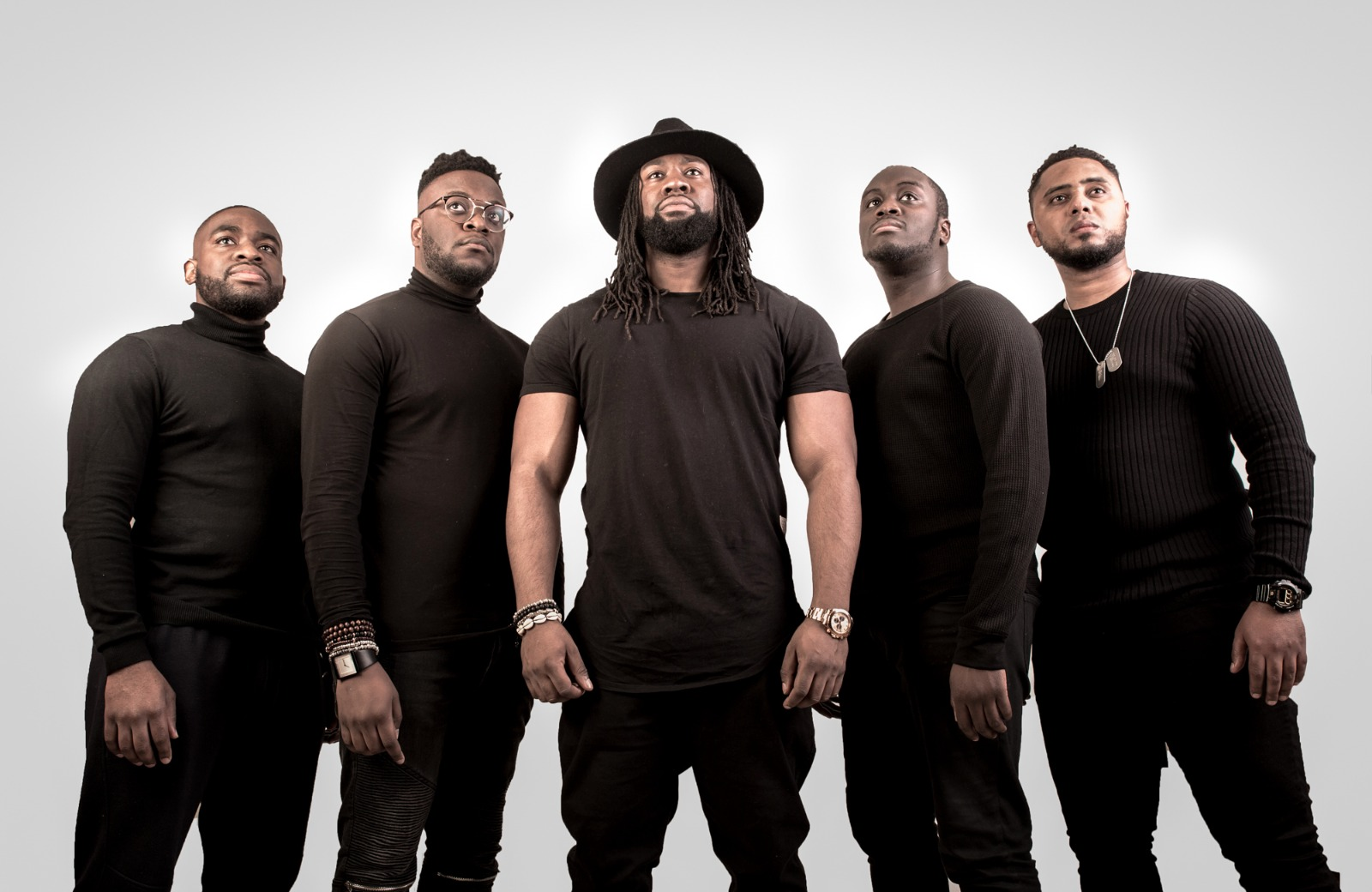
Vadé in 2018

Vadé is a British a cappella R&B quintet formed by Philip Yeboah and JJ Hammersley in the summer of 2013. The band's musical influences include Boyz II Men, Naturally 7 and Take 6.

Vadé produce covers of songs across a range of genres, medleys and original material.

The group has worked with Gregory Porter, Beverley Knight, Geri Halliwell, Katy B and Shaun Escoffrey. Vadé won Sky One's talent competition Sing: Ultimate A Cappella 2017 presented by Cat Deeley, which landed them a recording deal with Decca Records. Their debut studio album, Cry Your Heart Out was recorded at Abbey Road Studios and the title track was written by One Direction's Niall Horan.

Vadé won the title of 'Best Quintet' at the a cappella Music Awards in 2018.

Vadé are members of the Seventh-day Adventist Church.

Vadé competed in the fourteenth series of the British talent show The Voice UK, where they performed "Kiss from a Rose" by Seal. Coach Sir Tom Jones turned his chair, resulting in the group being automatically assigned to his team. They were eliminated in the Battles after performing "End of the Road" with Harry Linacre.

== Discography ==
Albums
Year	Title	Label
2017	Cry Your Heart Out	Decca Records

Singles
Year	Title	Written By	Label
2017	"Cry Your Heart Out"	Niall Horan	Decca Records
2019	"Be Mine" (ft. Jermaine Riley)	Jermaine Sanderson	Independent
2022	"Christmas Wish " (ft. Vadé )	Eric 'Blu2th' Griggs & Shawn Stockman	
2023	"Time After Time " (ft. The Swingles )	Cyndi Lauper	Platoon Records

== Members ==
- Jermaine Sanderson - First Tenor (2013 - Present)
- Philip Yeboah - Second Tenor/Baritone (2013 - Present)
- Roy Crisp - Third Tenor (2013 - Present)
- Joshua 'JJ' Hammerlsey - Bass (2013 - Present)

Former members

- Samuel Acquah – Baritone (2013–2015)
- Joseph Anti - Baritone (2015 - 2021)
