= Patrick Ecclesine =

American photographer

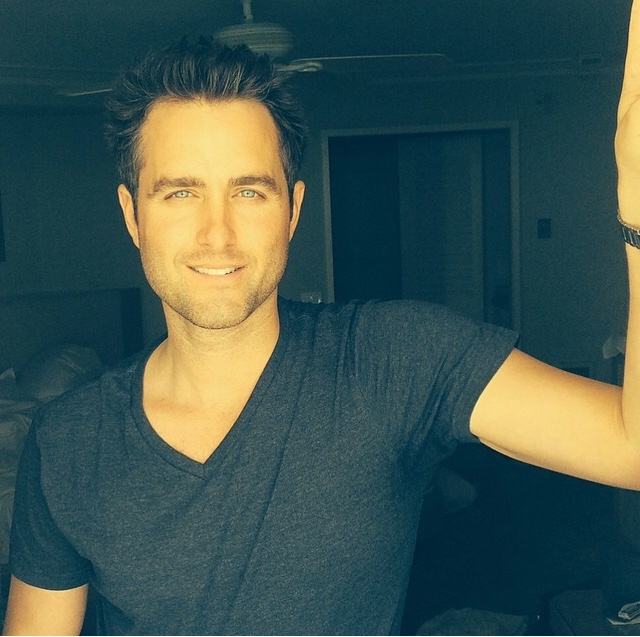
- Born: Los Angeles, California, U.S.
- Known for: Photography

Patrick Ecclesine is an American commercial and fine art photographer and director who has contributed extensively to Vanity Fair.

His images for film studios such as DreamWorks, Lionsgate and Warner Brothers, and television networks such as CBS, CNN, CW, FOX, Lifetime, OWN, Showtime, TBS and TNT have appeared in magazines and newspapers and on billboards and bus benches throughout the world.

He has shot portraits of many notable celebrities including Angelina Jolie, Steven Spielberg, Jamie Foxx, Jason Statham, Nick Jonas, Robert Downey Jr., Jennifer Aniston, and has collaborated often with singer Demi Lovato. Ecclesine directed Demi Lovato's, Stone Cold music video which has been seen 205 million times. Ecclesine also photographed Lovato for her famous "Spontaneous, nude, makeup free photoshoot" which Ecclesine detailed in a bombshell article for Vanity Fair.

He currently resides in his hometown of Hollywood, CA, around the corner from the street on which he was born - Sunset Boulevard.

In 2008, Ecclesine honored that world-famous boulevard with his social-documentary photography book Faces of Sunset Boulevard: A Portrait of Los Angeles. Published by Santa Monica Press, Faces of Sunset Boulevard was named Top Photography Book of 2008 by Shutterbug Magazine, and won first place in the 2009 SCIBA Awards, an honor shared with Annie Leibovitz’s book Leibovitz at Work. PopMatters critic Rodger Jacobs declared, "Faces of Sunset Boulevard is, without a doubt, one of the strongest statements about man's dark fate in the West ever committed to paper in the author and photographer's chosen form, whether or not Ecclesine intended for the book to have profound impact." His hometown paper of record The Los Angeles Times commented, "Ecclesine's emphasis is on the people, not the street. And he's got an eye for a magazine-like, flattering beauty: Everyone glows."

He has exhibited his work at the Annenberg Foundation's Annenberg Space for Photography, Los Angeles City Hall, ArcLight Hollywood and at the Rotes Rathaus in Berlin, Germany.

Ecclesine has shot marketing campaigns for many of television's most popular shows, including Twin Peaks, Bosch, Homeland, 90210, Glee, House of Lies, The Following, Lie To Me, Melrose Place, Prison Break, Hell's Kitchen and Project Runway.

Ecclesine is currently collaborating with acclaimed television director and producer Daniel Sackheim on a neo-noir photographic project called Slow Kiss.
