= Ardú Vocal Ensemble =

Irish a cappella group

Ardú Vocal Ensemble are an award-winning a cappella group, based in Dublin, Ireland. They were founded in 2013 by tenor Ciarán Kelly. Ardú specialise in original arrangements of well-known popular and folk music for six voices, exploring the use of the voice as an instrument with percussive sounds as well as melody and harmony. Ardú have pioneered the genre of a cappella music in Ireland with performances at the Cork International Choral Festival, the Edinburgh Fringe Festival, London A Cappella Festival and have been featured on BBC Radio Ulster, RTÉ Lyric FM, RTÉ Radio 1 and The Ray D'Arcy Show on RTÉ 1.

In July 2017, Ardú founded and hosted the first Irish International A Cappella Festival in Dublin. This included the second Ireland's A Cappella Competition and featured The Swingles as the headline act.

In October 2017, Ardú competed in the new talent show Sing: Ultimate A Cappella on Sky 1, hosted by Cat Deeley. Aired on 6 October 2017 on Sky 1 and Now TV.

Ardú competed in the fourteenth series of the British talent show The Voice UK, where they performed a medley of "Anxiety" by Doechii and "Somebody That I Used to Know" by Gotye. Coach will.i.am turned his chair, resulting in the group being automatically assigned to his team. They were eliminated in the Battles after performing "Home" with Bella Popera.

== Awards ==
=== National ===
Ardú were awarded first prize in both the National Chamber Choir category and the Light, Jazz and Popular Music category of the Cork International Choral Festival 2017. They were also awarded the John Mannion Memorial Trophy for their performance of 'Butterfly' by Mia Makaroff. Ardú were awarded 1st prize in the National Vocal Ensemble Competition at the City of Derry International Choir Festival 2015. They were awarded runners up in the RTÉ Lyric FM Choirs for Christmas competition 2015 with their rendition of White Christmas, arranged by Fabio Alessi. They won the prize in 2018 for their rendition of Text Me Merry Christmas, arranged by Straight No Chaser.

=== International ===
Ardú regularly tour internationally with the support of Culture Ireland, and have won audience awards at international a cappella festivals vokal.total in Austria (2019), Solala (2026) and Vocal Champs in Germany (2026).

== Recordings ==
- Ardú EP Back, In Time, released October 2014.
- Ardú debut album NOVA, released November 2015.
- Ardú album Gravity, released September, 2018.
- Ardú album LIVE, released December 2020.
- Ardú album Songs from Here, released June 2022. Awarded runner-up in the CARA Awards for Best European Album.

== Other work ==
In January 2016, Ardú were featured on the IrishJobs.ie “Add Your Voice” campaign alongside Irish choir Cantóirí. They recorded the original piece “Workplace Tango” composed and arranged by Ernest Dines.
