= The South of the Slot =

- Short story by Jack London
- Country: United States
- Language: English
- Genre: Short story

Publication
- Publication type: Magazine
- Publisher: Saturday Evening Post
- Publication date: 1909

"The South of the Slot" is a short story by American naturalist writer Jack London (1876–1916). It was first published in The Saturday Evening Post, Vol. 181, May, 1909. In 1914, it was published by Macmillan in a collection of Jack London’s stories, The Strength of the Strong. The title of the story refers to a location in San Francisco, which is now called SOMA, or South of Market.

== Plot summary ==
Frederick "Freddie" Drummond is a sociology professor at the University of California (today the University of California, Berkeley) leading a rather dull life. He has few friends and is very reserved and stiff. He is engaged to a very wealthy woman by the name of Catherine van Vorst who comes from an aristocratic family.

However, he becomes fascinated with the working-class section of San Francisco south of Market Street ("the Slot" refers to the cable car line which runs along the street) and starts working there. By impersonating a workingman he examines the “south of the slot” to gain better understanding of the area. Over time, Freddie Drummond develops an alter ego, Big Bill Totts, who becomes more and more involved in the working life and labor organizing in the district. While making his ventures to the south, he meets and starts a relationship with the President of the International Glove Workers’ Union, Mary Condon. Still, when resuming his life as the professor, he continues to express Conservative opinions, side strongly with the employers and sharply condemn the same trade unions in which he is deeply involved in his other life. Freddie/Bill realizes that he cannot maintain his dual life and hopes to achieve happiness by Catherine Van Vorst’s side.

The story’s climax comes as Freddie and Catherine, quite accidentally it seems, run into a strike in the middle of Market Street. Here, we can observe Freddie’s moment of decision that takes places precisely between his two worlds. When recognized as Big Bill Totts, Freddie quickly morphs into Big Bill and joins the labor unrest leaving Catherine Van Vorst forever. In the end, Freddie/Bill had been correct. He could not maintain this dual existence. What he did not realize was which side of his personality would eventually win out and which would be discarded.

== Background ==
Jack London was born when his mother was living in the area at South Park, San Francisco. He had subsequently spent time during visits there and knew it well.

== Major themes ==
=== Doubleness ===
Jack London examines doubleness in two dimensions – class and psychology. The former refers to the class division emphasized by the “slot” and the latter by the dual identity of the protagonist, Freddie Drummond.

=== Naturalism (determinism) ===
As a naturalist, Jack London believed in the lack of one’s free will, in the determining forces of nature. Thus, in the story it is the environment that influences Freddie Drummond and his perception of himself. In the beginning, the reader is convinced that Freddie has accepted his role in the society, that he is content with his personality even with the existence of his alter ego. The conflict appears when Bill Totts falls in love. This is when “Big Bill” surpasses Freddie Drummond as he “emitted an unearthly and uncultured yell” and decides to follow his heart and join the labor protest. Because of this, only the strongest can survive.

=== Socialism ===
This is one of the works in which Jack London's Socialist views are most strongly evident. The story is clearly slanted to give the reader the feeling that the protagonist has made the right choice, and that the life of a union organizer leading strikes and loving a fellow unionist is much preferable to that of a staid conservative professor with an upper-class wife.
