= Rodger Jacobs =

American dramatist

- Born: Rodger Dean Jacobs; March 12, 1959; San Francisco, California, U.S.
- Died: July 5, 2016 (aged 57); Los Angeles, California, U.S.
- Occupations: Journalist, writer, author, film producer, columnist, playwright, editor, screenwriter
- Known for: Wadd: The Life & Times of John C. Holmes
- Partner: Lela Michael
- Children: Carole Jacobs

Rodger Dean Jacobs (March 12, 1959 – July 5, 2016) was an American journalist, writer, author, film producer, columnist, playwright, editor and screenwriter.

== Career ==
Jacobs was a journalist for publications such as Salon, Los Angeles Review of Books, Las Vegas Sun, Eye, Hustler and PopMatters. He also worked for many years as an AVN award-winning adult film industry screenwriter and trade journalist.

In 1999, Jacobs wrote an essay about author Jack London entitled, Running with the Wolves: Jack London and the Cult of Masculinity. In 2010, Jacobs provided the preface for Jack London's San Francisco Stories, an anthology for Sydney Samizdat Press.

Go Irish: The Purgatory Diaries of Jason Miller, a play based on actor Jason Miller, known for the role of Father Damien Karras in the film The Exorcist, that Jacobs co-wrote with Tom Flannery, had its world premiere in 2007 and was displayed in various theatrical venues in Pennsylvania and upstate New York with actor Robert Thomas Hughes, a childhood friend of Jason Miller. Writing in Stage magazine, critic Jack Shaw hailed Purgatory Diaries as "a stirring examination of celebrity madness." Go Irish was performed again in 2015 by Robert Thomas Hughes.

In 2007, Jacobs wrote and directed a live presentation, The Ragged Promised Land, for the Vesuvio Cafe and The Beat Museum in San Francisco to commemorate the 50th anniversary of the publication of Jack Kerouac's On the Road. In 2009, he released Mr. Bukowski's Wild Ride, a collection of original surrealist fiction, for exclusive consignment sale at City Lights Books in San Francisco; writing in the Self-Publishing Review, author Henry Baum cited the book as "another piece to add to (Bukowski's) towering myth … it also gets to the soul of the man … as funny as any of Bukowski's own writing."

Jacobs' controversial series for the Pulitzer Prize-winning Las Vegas Sun, The New Homeless, about Jacobs and his girlfriend Lela Michael and their experiences with homelessness in Las Vegas, elicited praise and commentary from LA Weekly, Witness LA, The Awl and La Presse. The series was also the subject of a three part documentary by Katharine Euphrat featuring Rodger Jacobs and Lela Michael.

Silver Birch Press published Jacobs' original work The Furthest Palm in August 2012.

In December 2012, Jacobs' collection of short fiction and novellas, Invisible Ink (The Book Motel), was lauded as the "most exemplary L.A. book of 2012" by Joseph Mailander in his City Watch L.A. column.

Salon and Los Angeles Review of Books published Jacobs' Franz Kafka themed essay in January 2013 entitled Did Kafka Invent Noir?

Jacobs was also a film producer best known for being the screenwriter and producer of the 1998 documentary Wadd: The Life & Times of John C. Holmes.

== Death ==
Jacobs died at home on July 5, 2016, in Los Angeles, California at age 57. Jacobs was cremated on September 15, 2016, in Los Angeles County.

After learning of Jacobs' death, Jacobs' former girlfriend Lela Michael attempted to preserve his archives yet failed to do so since the two were never married. Lela Michael called off her efforts and died from metastatic melanoma cancer at Sutter Lakeside Hospital in Lakeport, California on July 28, 2016, at age 57, twenty-four days after Jacobs' passing.
