= Next Star (Romanian TV series) =

Romanian reality television series

Next Star is a Romanian reality competition television series broadcast on the Romanian television station Antena 1. It debuted in 2013. The focus of the series was to discover singing talent in those aged 3 to 13 years. The top prize is 20,000 euros. The series is presented by Dan Negru, and contestants are assessed by a jury of professionals. Famous performers from Romania and elsewhere occasionally take part to co-sing with the children.

The show was launched in 2013 and the first winner was Omar Arnaout, a Romanian of mixed Lebanese-Romanian origin. In later seasons, children from other countries were qualified to participate to become the "Next Star International". Besides solo participants, bands consisting of groups of children were also allowed to participate in competition.

== The jury ==
The original jury was composed of Pepe, CRBL, Alina Eremia and Dorian Popa. For 5 seasons the jury was composed of Pepe, Connect-R, Maria Cârneci, Lora and Vasile Muraru. In the ninth season, the jury changed to be composed of Pepe, Lidia Buble and Dorian Popa.

== Winners ==
- Omar Arnaout (season 1: 2013); Runner-up: Teodora Sava
- Vanessa Marzavan (season 2: 2013)
- Rose Marie Lanciu (season 3: 2014)
- Isabela Pampărau (season 4: 2014)
- Emily Moskailenco (season 5: 2015)
- Andrea Tucaliuc (season 6: 2016)
- Yasmina Butilă (season 7: 2016)
- Katia Carbune (season 8: 2017)
- Mihai Dobre (season 9: 2018)
- Școala"Recea"(Season 10:2021)
