= Valley of the Moon Natural History Association =

The Valley of the Moon Natural History Association (VMNHA) is a 501(c)(3) Non-Profit Organization based in Sonoma County, CA which cares for the Jack London, Annadel and Sugarloaf Ridge State Parks.

== History ==
The Valley of the Moon Natural History Association was established in 1977. The Association’s first newsletter came out in 1982 under the banner of Moonletter and has been going ever since. The mid 1980s saw the formation of the inaugural Docent Council, which has since grown to over 100 active volunteers, as well as the Jack London Beauty Ranch Restoration Committee, which put on community consciousness- and fund-raising festivals and lobbied Sacramento HQ to produce a General Plan for Jack London State Historic Park twenty years ahead of schedule, thus enabling physical restoration to begin. As a result, by the end of 2006 London’s Cottage, a completely refurnished historic house museum, was opened to the public.

Other projects embarked on by the VMNHA since the 1990s include a museum exhibit of the Cruise of the Snark and funding the “Wolf House Express” golf carts to help State Parks meet its mandated obligation to provide disabled access to key interpretive sites within the park.

Photography and fine arts field seminars, piano recitals on Charmian London’s Steinway to raise money to restore it, storytelling and dramatic presentations by Jack London portrayers were all sponsored by the VMNHA. While Jack London’s empty and partially restored Cottage awaited its final infusion of state funds VMNHA docents designed and executed an extensive photographic display funded by the Association that kept alive the building’s significance in the Beauty Ranch story.

From 2000 on, the VMNHA has played a key role in providing monetary support for training, coordination and recognition of docents, volunteer trail maintenance, Cottage staffing, Earth Day projects, and a series of exhibit shelters and displays at Annadel and Jack London Parks. The contents of the displays on London’s ranch and inside the House of Happy Walls, produced by a team of volunteers from the Board working with the park staff and partly funded by the Sonoma County Landmarks Commission, are the result of hundreds of hours of donated labor.

In 2010, the organization published a book about Jack London's Wolf House.
