= Albert L. Farr =

American architect (1871–1947)

Albert Lincoln Farr
- Born: October 8, 1871; Omaha, Nebraska, US
- Died: July 12, 1947 (aged 75); Piedmont, California, US
- Occupation: Architect

Albert Lincoln Farr (October 8, 1871 – July 12, 1947) was an American architect, who was known for designing residences in the Craftsman and Georgian styles. He was active in the San Francisco Bay Area. Farr was part of the firm Farr & Ward.

== Early life ==
Born in Omaha, Nebraska, his early childhood was spent in Yokohama, Japan. The Farr family returned to the United States, and settled in Oakland in the San Francisco Bay Area and he attended Oakland High School. Farr lived at various times in San Francisco (at 2528 Union Street), and also briefly in Berkeley, settled in Piedmont, and Oakland.

== Career ==
From 1909 through the end of his career he maintained an office at 68 Post Street in San Francisco.

Farr earned his architecture license in 1901, one of the first in California. He took on Joseph Francis Ward as an associated architect partner in 1922, eventually naming his firm Farr & Ward. Farr and his firm designed buildings throughout the San Francisco Bay Area, particularly in the San Francisco neighborhoods of Russian Hill, Pacific Heights, Sea Cliff, and St. Francis Wood. Many of his designs involve a facade of brown wooden shingles.

The Sundial Lodge, also known today as the L'Auberge Carmel, a Relais & Châteaux property, is a historic Medieval Revival hotel in Carmel-by-the-Sea, California. It was designed by Farr and was built in 1929–1930, by master builder Michael J. Murphy. It was designated as an important commercial building in the city's Downtown Historic District Property Survey, and was recorded with the Department of Parks and Recreation on December 5, 2002.

== Projects ==
Farr also designed houses in Belvedere, Piedmont and Woodside. One of his most famous is the Wolf House for Jack London, in Glen Ellen. The 15,000-square-foot (1,400 m^{2}) home burned before construction was completed. Long thought to be the result of an arson, a later analysis of the ruins, located in Jack London State Historic Park, determined the cause to be spontaneous combustion.

== Death ==
Farr died on July 12, 1947, in Piedmont, California. He was buried in the Mountain View Cemetery in Oakland, California.

== List of works ==
- Babcock House (1901), 2660 Scott Street, San Francisco, California
- Wolf House (1913), Glen Ellen, California; burned down, contributing property to the U.S. Historic district
- 2570 Jackson (1923), Pacific Heights, San Francisco, California; now the French Consul-General's house
- 3450 Washington (1929), Presidio Heights, San Francisco, California; by Farr & Ward
- L'Auberge Carmel (1929), Monte Verde Street at 7th Avenue, Carmel-by-the-Sea, California
- Aetna Springs Resort (1930), 1600 Aetna Springs Road, Pope Valley, California; by Farr & Ward, NRHP-listed
