= Transcendence Theatre Company =

- Type: Theatre group
- Purpose: Nonprofit Professional Regional Theatre Company
- Location: Sonoma County, California
- Artistic director: Amy Miller
- Notable members: Sutton Foster, Megan McGinnis, Ben Vereen
- Website: transcendencetheatre.org

Transcendence Theatre Company is a professional regional theatre company founded in 2008 in Sonoma County, California. The company produces Broadway concerts and musicals.

It presents both outdoor and indoor musical performances. The company's primary venue is an open-air stage at Jack London State Historic Park.

== History ==
Transcendence Theatre Company (TTC) was established in 2008 as a 501c3 non-profit performing arts organization.

The company produces musical theatre performances in both outdoor and indoor settings, most notably in Jack London State Historic Park. Since 2011, it has hosted an annual summer series called Broadway Under the Stars, which presents musical revues with a rotating cast. Performers in the series have included artists with backgrounds in national and international stage productions.

Founders include Amy Miller (artistic director), Brad Surosky (co-Executive Director), and Stephan Stubbins (Co-Executive Director until February 2020).

In 2020-2021, the company faced repeated public allegations from former employees, artists, alumni, and former board leadership involving racism, suppression of diversity initiatives, toxic workplace culture, bullying, sexism, gaslighting, and inequitable leadership practices. These allegations were covered by several Bay area press outlets, including the San Francisco Chronicle, The Press Democrat, Petaluma Argus-Courier and North Bay Stage & Screen, which detailed the company’s alleged “ongoing suppression of equity, diversity, and inclusion practices”.

=== Timeline of performances and notable company developments ===
==== 2010 Project Knowledge ====
On February 20, 2010, TTC held a benefit performance at the American Film Institute in Los Angeles to formally announce "Project Knowledge," a three-month research tour across the United States in RVs.

Project Knowledge began on March 2, 2010. Participants interviewed during Project Knowledge included Molly Smith (Arena Stage), Curt Columbus (Trinity Rep), Bill Rauch (Oregon Shakespeare Festival), Ken Davenport, Mike Daisey, Todd London, Abigale Adams (People's Light & Theatre), Joseph Haj, Dudley Cocke (Roadside Theater), Bob Leonard (Department of Theatre Arts at Virginia Tech), Polly Carl (Steppenwolf Theatre Company), Cynthia Rider (Kansas City Rep), Wayne Bryan (Music Theatre of Wichita), Anthony Radich (WESTAF), Jim Caron (Missoula Children's Theatre), Kurt Beattle (ACT), Carlo Scandiuzzi (ACT), Greg Phillips (Portland Center Stage), Creon Thorne (Portland Center Stage), Joan Schirle (Dell'Arte International), Arlene Goldbard.

==== 2011 Benefit concert ====
In 2011, TTC produced "Broadway Under the Stars," a benefit concert for the Valley of the Moon Natural History Association, a 501(c)(3) non-profit organization that manages Jack London, Annadel, and Sugarloaf Ridge State Parks. Fourteen Performers donated their time to sing in the benefit.

==== 2012 Season - First full season ====
In 2012, TTC produced its first full season of concerts in Jack London State Historic Park. A portion of the proceeds from each concert was donated to the Valley of the Moon Natural History Association. The season included four separate themed concerts with a total of 14 nights of performances, as well as a Broadway kids camp for children ages 8–18.

==== 2014 Season - Paint The Universe ====
In 2014, TTC's season theme was Paint the Universe. The company partnered with Benziger Family Winery to develop an exclusive wine blend named Paint the Universe, collaborated with singer-songwriter Carrie Manolakos to produce an original season song written by Carrie Manolakos, Andrew Allen, and Robin Ghosh, and partnered with artist Lindsay Manolakos for an original painting inspired by the season's theme.

==== 2015 Season - Best Night Ever ====
In 2015, TTC's season theme was Best Night Ever. The company produced a season of four "Broadway Under the Stars" concerts between June 19 and September 13 in Jack London State Historic Park. The concerts were entitled "Oh What A Night," "Fantastical Family Night," "Rhythm of Life," and "Gala Celebration Concert." In addition to being presented at Jack London State Historic Park, on June 24, 2015, "Oh What A Night," was presented at Luther Burbank Center for the Arts. The company also produced a concert series entitled "Transcendence Artist Series" and presented the shows at various venues around Sonoma County, including Paradise Ridge Winery and Jacuzzi Winery. The concerts in that series included "Superheroes in Love," "Megan Hilty in Concert," "Off To The Cloud," and "Imagine." December 4–5, TTC presented their first ever holiday show at Luther Burbank Center for the Arts. The show was entitled "Joy to the World."

==== 2019 Season ====
In 2019, TTC produced its first book musical, "A Chorus Line," in the ruins of Jack London State Historic Park as a part of its Broadway Under the Stars summer season.

==== 2020 Season - Co-founder departure and Virtual Performances ====
In January 2020 TTC Co-founder and Co-Executive Director Stephan Stubbins publicly announced he was departing the company to reside in New York City with his new wife, Broadway actress, Libby Servais.

Beginning in July 2020 TTC produced four separate virtual productions: "Don't Stop Believin'," "Fantastical Family Night," "I Hope You Dance," and "The Gala Celebration." The productions ran between July 24 - September 13.

==== 2021 Allegations of toxic culture ====
In February 2021 TTC Director of Education and Community Engagement Nikko Kimzin publicly announced that he had resigned, stating his reasons as “…the Transcendence Executive Team’s ongoing suppression of equity, diversity, and inclusion practices and inaction toward becoming an equitable theater” and for their creation of “a hostile work environment where I could no longer be successful in serving all of our diverse communities.” The organization received further coverage of their efforts to address the situation.

==== 2025 Season - Best Night Ever ====
In 2025, Transcendence Theatre Company is presenting a new season featuring three productions:

Broadway's Best Night Ever (June 12 – 15; June 19 – 22)

Beautiful – The Carole King Musical (August 7 – 10; August 14 – 17)

Ladies of Broadway (September 4 – 7; September 11 – 14)

The season continues the company's tradition of combining Broadway talent with the scenic backdrop of Jack London State Historic Park. Each production offers a blend of musical theatre favorites, contemporary hits, and original storytelling, showcasing a diverse lineup of performers from national tours and Broadway stages.

=== Relationship with Jack London State Historic Park ===
As of the summer of 2017 Transcendence had given over $350,000 to Jack London State Park. As of January, 2020, Transcendence had given over $515,000 to Jack London State Park.

== Awards ==
Year	Organization	Award	Result
2012	Broadway World San Francisco	Best Special Theater Event	Won
2013	Broadway World San Francisco	Best Choreographer	Won
2013	Broadway World San Francisco	Best Production Performance for Youth	Won
2013	Broadway World San Francisco	Best Special Theater Event	Won
2013	Broadway World San Francisco	Theater of the Year	Won
2013	Sonoma Valley Sun	Best Individual Performance - Stephan Stubbins	Won
2014	USAToday 10-Best	Outdoor Concert Venues You Shouldn't Miss	Won
2014	Press Democrat	Best Local Live Theater Event	Nominated
2014	Broadway World San Francisco	Best Production Performance By Youth	Won
2014	Broadway World San Francisco	Best Community Theater	Won
2014	4C's of Sonoma County	Champion For Children	Won
2014	Broadway World San Francisco	Best Choreographer - Molly Alvarez	Won
2014	Broadway World San Francisco	Best Direction of a Musical - Melissa Giattino	Won
2014	Broadway World San Francisco	Best Lighting Design - Jeffery Porter	Won
2014	Broadway World San Francisco	Best Individual Performance - Lexy Fridell	Won
2014	North Bay Business Journal	40 Under 40 Award - Amy Miller	Won
2015	Broadway World San Francisco	Best Special Theater Event	Won
2015	Broadway World San Francisco	Best Best Production Performance By Youth	Won
2015	Broadway World San Francisco	Best Best Production Performance For Youth	Won
2015	Broadway World San Francisco	Best Choreography (Local) - Amanda Lehman & Dylan Smith	Won
2015	Broadway World San Francisco	Best Leading Actor in a Musical (Local) - Nicolas Dromard	Won
2015	Broadway World San Francisco	Best Direction of a Musical - Roy Lightner	Won
2015	Broadway World San Francisco	Best Leading Actress in a Musical (Local) - Desiree Davar	Won
2015	Broadway World San Francisco	Best Lighting Design - Jeffery Porter	Won
2015	Broadway World San Francisco	Best Scenic Design (Local) - Michael Kramer	Won
2015	Broadway World San Francisco	Best Sound Design (Local) - Nils Erikson	Won
2015	Broadway World San Francisco	Person to Watch (Female) - Amy Miller	Won
2015	Broadway World San Francisco	Person to Watch (Male) - Eric Jackson	Won
2016	Broadway World San Francisco	Best Special Theater Event (Wine Country Speakeasy)	Won
2016	Broadway World San Francisco	Best Production Performed for Youth	Won
2016	Broadway World San Francisco	Best Costume Design (Local) - Janis Snyder	Won
2016	Broadway World San Francisco	Best Featured Actress in a Musical - Keri Safran	Won
2016	North Bay Bohemian	Best Live Performing Dance Company	Won
2016	The Press Democrat	Best Theater Company	Won
2017	Sonoma Valley Sun	Best Live Show or Production	Won
2017	North Bay Bohemian	Best Performing Dance Company	Won
2017	North Bay Bohemian	Best Production	Won
2017	North Bay Business Journal	40 Under 40 Award - Brad Surosky	Won
2017	North Bay Business Journal	40 Under 40 Award - Stephan Stubbins	Won
2020	Broadway World San Francisco	Theatre of the Decade	Won
