= Nicolas Dromard =

Canadian singer and stage actor

- Born: October 7, 1980 (age 46); Ottawa, Ontario, Canada
- Occupations: Singer, actor, dancer
- Years active: 1999–present

Nicolas Dromard (born October 7, 1980) is a Canadian singer and stage actor, best known for his performances as Fiyero in the San Francisco sit-down production of the musical Wicked. He also performed in the Broadway musical version of Mary Poppins as part of the original Broadway cast ensemble, and later as Bert on Broadway and in the National Tour. He recently performed in the national tour and Broadway productions of Jersey Boys as Tommy DeVito.

== Early life ==
Born in Ottawa, Ontario, Canada, Dromard attended the Greta Leeming Studio of Dance in Nepean, Ontario in his youth. He went on to study music at École secondaire publique De La Salle, a performing arts high school in Ottawa, where he learned to play the piano and the flute.

He was inspired to start dancing when he saw a Fred Astaire and Ginger Rogers movie. He would dance in the halls at school, and his teacher told his parents to sign him up for dance lessons.

He studied singing under the instruction of Yoriko Tanno-Kimmons, who runs a voice studio in Ottawa.

Dromard's first language was French; born to French parents, he didn't learn English until the age of seven.

Dromard's first paid acting role was "Little Boy" in a TV movie called The Tin Soldier at age 12.

Dromard was very active in his hometown, participating in amateur community theater shows such as Anne of Green Gables – The Musical and Crazy for You (musical).

In 1998, he was in New York City at a dance contest when he was scouted to be part of the Radio City Productions Christmas Spectacular at a satellite production in Branson, Missouri.

In 1999, Dromard earned his Canadian Actors' Equity Association card by performing in West Side Story at the Stratford Festival of Canada in Stratford, Ontario. He earned his American Actors' Equity Association card when he performed in the 2002 Broadway revival Oklahoma! as Sam.

== Wicked ==
=== 1st national tour ===
Dromard was cast as an ensemble member (a swing) in the 1st national tour of the musical Wicked in October 2004, after spending eight hours dancing and singing in auditions. The production started previews at the Canon Theatre in Toronto, Canada on March 9, 2005, and officially opened on March 21, 2005. Stephanie J. Block and Kendra Kassebaum originated the roles of Elphaba and Glinda, respectively. Alongside them were Derrick Williams as Fiyero, David Garrison as the Wizard, Carol Kane as Madame Morrible, Jenna Leigh Green as Nessarose, Logan Lipton as Boq, and Timothy Britten Parker as Doctor Dillamond.

=== San Francisco ===
After auditioning for the role of Fiyero in October 2008, he was chosen to star in Wicked's San Francisco open-ended engagement, alongside Teal Wicks as Elphaba and Kendra Kassebaum as Glinda. The San Francisco production began previews on January 27, 2009, at the Orpheum Theatre, and officially opened on February 6, 2009.

Both Dromard and the San Francisco production received critical acclaim, including:

The SF Examiner:

"I have to admit Nicolas Dromard as rich boy and cavalier Fiyero, the mutual love interest, puts on a fine one-man show. He looks young, handsome and virile, singing and dancing and strutting about with bravado. While it turns out Fiyero has a heart and some dignity, his entry would almost make the prince from Beauty and the Beast swoon. Bravo!"

The Contra Costa Times:

"... and Nicolas Dromard, who creates an achingly believable character in Fiyero, the dashing fellow who charms both young witches."

Dromard performed during the production with both Academy Award winner Patty Duke and Emmy Award winner Carol Kane, both as Madame Morrible. Dromard left the cast on June 26, 2010, to play Bert in Mary Poppins on Broadway. He was replaced as Fiyero by Cliffton Hall.

The San Francisco production of Wicked was seen by nearly a million people during its first year, according to The Best of Broadway, and averaged over $1.0 million in weekly grosses at the box office, according to Variety Magazine. Wicked was named "Musical of the Decade" in 2009 by Entertainment Weekly and termed "the defining musical of the decade" by The New York Times.

The San Francisco production of Wicked closed on September 5, 2010.

== Mary Poppins ==
=== Original Broadway cast ===
Dromard performed as part of the ensemble (swing) in the original cast of Mary Poppins on Broadway, which premiered at the New Amsterdam Theatre. It started previews on October 14, 2006, and officially opened on November 16, 2006. It starred Ashley Brown in the title role of Mary Poppins and Gavin Lee as Bert. Dromard understudied many roles in the ensemble as a swing, including Von Hussler, William, and Bert.

=== Broadway ===
In early 2010, Dromard auditioned again for Mary Poppins, and landed the role of Bert in the Broadway production. This meant he would not finish out Wicked's San Francisco run (which was to end in September 2010), and he left the role of Fiyero on June 27, 2010. He played the role of Bert on Broadway for four weeks in 2010 (from July 16 to August 23) before heading out on the national tour.

In December 2012, he announced via his website that he will once again being playing the role of Bert on Broadway. He will be performing the role at the "New Amsterdam Theater" in New York from January 10, 2013, until August 8, 2013 (barring a contract extension).

=== National tour ===
Nicolas Dromard performed the role of Bert on tour for a year and a half, starting in September 2010 in Indianapolis, Indiana and ending in March 2012. During his run, he played opposite actresses Caroline Sheen and Laura Michelle Kelly, both of whom portrayed the role of Mary Poppins.

Dromard has earned much praise for his role as Bert, receiving rave reviews at every tour stop:

The Grand Rapids Press:

"Nicolas Dromard is a delight as Bert, the omnipresent tradesman/narrator, who's sweet on Mary. As he lights the street lamps and sweeps the street, he playfully pushes along the set pieces."

The Salt Lake Tribune:

"Which brings us full-circle to what makes Dromard's role such a show-stealer. [...] 'This is harder than it looks,' Bert understates to the audience, as he begins tap-dancing up the wall, singing all the while, the stunt capped by a key change (!) while he's upside down at the top of the theater's proscenium arch. The authenticity of the line explains everything about acting and theatrical spectacle and his character, all at once."

Around the Town Chicago:

"Bert (a very talented Nicolas Dromard) who also serves as storyteller does a dance during the 'Step In Time' that will knock your socks off, as he dances up the side wall, then taps while upside down and then comes down the other side. his is a number that is truly a show stopper and worth the price of the ticket on its own."

== Jersey Boys ==
On May 1, 2013, Nicolas Dromard announced on his website that he was going to be joining the National Tour of Jersey Boys as Tommy Devito. His first performance was on June 4, 2013, in Salt Lake City, Utah.

He's already received critical acclaim for his role:

Deseret News:

"The success of the musical rests heavily on the quality of the four leads — performers required to act, sing, dance a bit and play instruments (when you see them playing on stage, they are actually playing) — and the four men in the touring show deliver plenty of Jersey swagger. [...] Joining [Nick Cosgrove] at the mic stands are Nicolas Dromard (DeVito), Jason Kappus (Gaudio) and Brandon Andrus (Nick Massi). The men lilt in and out of scenes, into songs and into narration quite seamlessly with a believable rapport and fantastic sound."

Broadway World Reviews:

"Instead of a tribute show with impersonations of the Four Seasons, the focus of these superb actors is on creating engaging, dramatic portrayals. Surprisingly enough, it was the first performance for Nicolas Dromard, making his debut as Tommy DeVito. He joins Nick Cosgrove as Frankie Valli, Brandon Andrus in the Nick Massi role and Jason Kappus as Bob Gaudio in the bio-musical of the early 1960s group."

On December 22, 2015, Nicolas Dromard temporarily joined the cast of Jersey Boys on Broadway at the August Wilson Theatre.

== Additional theatre ==
=== Mamma Mia ===
In 2000, Dromard was part of the ensemble for the North American premiere of Mamma Mia, which started in Toronto. It made its United States premiere at the Orpheum Theatre in San Francisco before heading to Broadway.

=== The Boy From Oz ===
In 2003, Dromard was a part of the ensemble in The Boy from Oz, a musical from Martin Sherman and directed by Philip Wm. McKinley. The production started previews at the Imperial Theatre on September 16, 2003, and officially opened on October 16, 2003. It starred Hugh Jackman in the lead role of Peter Allen. The production closed on September 12, 2004.

=== Hairspray ===
Dromard joined the ensemble of Hairspray for the 2004 production in Toronto, Ontario, Canada. The production started previews on April 8, 2004, at the Princess of Wales Theatre and officially opened on May 5, 2004. The production closed after seven months on November 28, 2004.

=== Dancing in the Dark ===
Nicolas Dromard was part of the ensemble for the world premiere of Dancing in the Dark, a musical directed by Gary Griffin with a book by Douglas Carter Beane. It premiered at The Old Globe Theatre in San Diego, California, and ran from March 4, 2008, to April 13, 2008. The show was based on the MGM film The Band Wagon and starred Scott Bakula in the lead role of "Tony Hunter."

=== White Christmas ===
In September 2012, it was announced that Dromard would be travelling to the Denver Center for the Performing Arts in Denver, Colorado to play the role of Phil Davis in Irving Berlin's White Christmas, a musical based on the movie-musical of the same name (White Christmas - 1954).

=== Workshops ===
==== Cry-Baby ====
In April 2007, Dromard participated in a workshop for Cry-Baby, which ran for 68 performances in New York City. Based on the movie of the same name by John Waters, the production went on (without Dromard) to officially open on Broadway on April 24, 2008, at the Marquis Theatre. It earned four Tony Award nominations and choreographer Rob Ashford won a Drama Desk Award for Outstanding Choreography.

==== Frog Kiss ====
Dromard played the role of Klaus in Frog Kiss, a musical produced by Tamara Tunie. Based on the classic tale of a frog who needs a kiss, It featured a book by Charles Leipart and music by Eric Schorr. It was chosen to be part of the New York Musical Theatre Festival in 2010, and seven shows were performed at the Theater at St. Clements.

==== Make Mine Manhattan ====
Nicolas Dromard starred in the workshopped revival of Make Mine Manhattan at the Connelly Theatre in New York City. It is based on the original 1940s revue of the same name. It was presented by the UnsungMusicalsCo.. Directed by Ben West, the show featured a book by Arnold B. Horwitt and music by Richard Lewine. It ran from March 1 to March 17, 2012.

The revue was met with critical acclaim:

BroadwayWorld:

"Broadway veteran and standout, Nicolas Dromard, charms his way as the narrator and carries the show along at a well-proportioned pace. His charisma, confidence, and style are evident in each song, dance, and skit, and can make even the most stoic person blush like a schoolgirl."

Used York City:

"Nicolas Dromard immediately sets a comfortable stage tone and his confident stage presence, as well as some fine dancing, makes him a stand out."

=== Other roles ===
==== Crazy For You ====
In 1996, Dromard starred as Bobby Child in his community theatre's production of Crazy For You. This Gershwin musical was produced by the Company of Musical Theatre in Ottawa.

==== West Side Story ====
Nicolas Dromard portrayed Big Deal in the Stratford Festival of Canada's 1999 production of West Side Story (musical). He earned his Canadian Actors' Equity Association membership for this performance.

==== Dracula ====
In 1999, Dromard was the standby for Renfield in a Stratford Festival of Canada production of Dracula, a musical version of Bram Stoker's Dracula. It featured a book by Richard Ouzounian and music by Marek Norman.

==== Gypsy ====
In early 2003, Nicolas Dromard played the role of Tulsa in the Stephen Sondheim musical Gypsy at the Arkansas Repertory Theatre.

== Nominations and awards ==
2011: BroadwayWorld Boston Award: Best Actor in a Touring Production (Mary Poppins)
2012: IRNE Award (Independent Reviewers of New England) Nomination: Best Visiting Performer (Mary Poppins)
2012: BWW Critics Choice Awards (Jay's Picks): Best Featured Actor in a Musical (Touring) (Mary Poppins)

== Theatre credits ==
Start Date	Production	Role	Notes
June 4, 2013 - January 25, 2015	Jersey Boys	Tommy DeVito	National Tour
December 6, 2012 - December 26, 2012	White Christmas	Phil Davis	Denver Performing Arts Center
August 7, 2012 - September 3, 2012	Mary Poppins	Bert	National Tour; Ahmanson Theatre
March 1, 2012 - March 17, 2012	Make Mine Manhattan	Boy 1	Workshop - Connelly Theatre; UnsungMusicalsCo.
August 2010 - March 2012	Mary Poppins	Bert	National Tour; BroadwayWorld Boston Award: Best Actor in a Touring Production; BWW Critics Choice Awards (Jay's Picks): Best Featured Actor in a Musical (Touring)
July 16, 2010 - August 23, 2010	Mary Poppins	Bert	Broadway; New Amsterdam Theatre
Summer 2010	Frog Kiss	Klaus	Workshop
January 27, 2009 - June 27, 2010	Wicked	Fiyero	San Francisco Sit-Down Production; The Orpheum Theater
March 4, 2008 - April 13, 2008	Dancing in the Dark	Ensemble (u/s Tony)	The Old Globe Theatre
April 2007	Cry-Baby	Whiffle	Workshop
October 14, 2006 - March 2007	Mary Poppins	Ensemble	Original Broadway Cast; New Amsterdam Theatre
March 9, 2005 - September 2006	Wicked	Ensemble/Swing	First National Tour Original Cast; Canon Theatre
April 8, 2004 - November 28, 2004	Hairspray	Sketch (u/s Link & Corny)	Princess of Wales Theatre
September 16, 2003 - September 12, 2004	The Boy From Oz	Ensemble	Imperial Theatre
Spring 2003	Gypsy	Tulsa	Arkansas Repertory Theatre
February 23, 2002 - February 23, 2003	Oklahoma!	Sam (u/s Will Parker)	Broadway Revival; George Gershwin Theatre
2000	Mamma Mia!	Eddie/Pepper	North American Premiere/Tour
1999	Dracula	Renfield (u/s)	Stratford Festival of Canada
1999	West Side Story	Big Deal	Stratford Festival of Canada
1996	Crazy For You	Bobby Child	Company of Musical Theatre, Ottawa

== Benefits and other performances ==
Date	Event	Notes
July 2012	Broadway Under the Stars: Dream the Impossible Dream	Transcendence Theatre Company - Jack London State Historic Park
October 25, 2011	Sweep Dreams: Benefit Performance Featuring the Cast of Mary Poppins	The Mercury Theater
July 20, 2011	Mary Poppins Visits CHOC Children's Hospital	Children's Hospital of Orange County
August 12, 2010	Broadway in Bryant Park - Presented by 106.7 Lite FM - Mary Poppins Cast	Bryant Park

== Television ==
Date	Title	Role	Notes
1992	The Tin Soldier	Little Boy	
November 2, 2010	Dancing with the Stars	Bert	Cast of Mary Poppins
