= Q. Smith =

American stage actress

- Born: Quiana Smith; Omaha, Nebraska, U.S.

Quiana Smith (born 1978 or 1979) is an American stage actress best known for her involvement in the Broadway and touring productions of Mary Poppins, and originating the role of Hannah in Come from Away.

== Early life and education ==
Smith was born in Omaha, Nebraska to Llana and Rudy Smith. Although she began performing at a young age in her church's choir, she didn't become seriously interested in theater until late in high school, when two other African-American girls at Omaha North High School introduced her to show tunes. The first Broadway show she saw was Les Miserables, when it came on tour in Omaha. Smith was encouraged by her high school teachers to try singing opera, and she subsequently worked with the Omaha Symphony Orchestra.

Smith taught drama to children the summer before her senior year of high school, where she got the nickname "Q", when the children were unable to pronounce her given name, Quiana.

While auditioning for college theater programs, she studied drama at the University of Nebraska. In her sophomore year, she was able to transfer to Ithaca College. She graduated with a degree in musical theater from Ithaca College in 2000, one of the first two African-American women to graduate from the program.

== Career ==
After graduating from Ithaca College, Smith returned to Omaha and joined the Omaha Theatre Company for Young People. She later moved to New York City on a whim, staying with a friend while she auditioned. Her first show in the city was Smokey Joe’s Café.

Smith performed at events surrounding Barack Obama's inauguration ceremonies in 2009 and 2013, as a representative of the state of Nebraska.

In 2009, Smith joined the North American Tour of Mary Poppins, later becoming the first featured African-American actress in any of the musical's productions, in the role of Miss Andrew.

In 2015, Smith originated the role of Lana (later renamed Hannah) in the premiere of Come From Away at the La Jolla Playhouse. Smith, who had been living in Queens in September 2001 and was in the city on 9/11, was initially hesitant to take the role, but later changed her mind. She remained with the show, performing in its Broadway premiere in February 2017.

In 2016, Smith recorded and performed the season theme song for Transcendence Theatre Company, entitled "Live." The song was written by Rick McKee for Transcendence Theatre Company's 2016 season.

Smith has also been involved in teaching drama workshops, and in programs that use drama as a form of therapy. In addition to acting, Smith has been working on a book for over a decade; titled Queens of the Theatre, the book is based on women of color who have worked in theater, television, and film.

=== Roles ===
Year	Show	Role	Notes	Ref
	Smokey Joe’s Café			
2003	Fame	Mabel Washington	Off-Broadway	
2004	Aida	Nehebka	Regional	
2005	Abyssinia	Corine	Regional	
2006	Les Miserables	Swing	Broadway	
2009-2011	Mary Poppins	Ensemble, Miss Andrew, Miss Smythe, Queen Victoria	North American Tour	
2012	Mary Poppins	Miss Andrew, Miss Smythe, Queen Victoria	Broadway	
2013	Mary Poppins	Mrs. Corry, Miss Andrew	Regional	
2015	Come From Away	Lana	Regional	
2016	A Night with Janis Joplin	Joplinaire, Blues Woman, Aretha Franklin, Nina Simone	Regional	
2017-2019	Come From Away	Hannah	Broadway	
2021-2022	Come From Away	Hannah	Broadway	

== Nominations and awards ==
Year	Award	Show	Role	Category	Result	Ref
2015	Gypsy Rose Lee Awards	Come from Away	Lana	Excellence in Performance of a Musical as a Supporting Actor (Female) - any non-lead	Nominated	
2017	Helen Hayes Awards	Come from Away	Hannah	Outstanding Supporting Actress in a Musical-Hayes	Nominated	

== Personal life ==
Smith married fellow actor Lawrence Stallings in 2018. The couple have one son.
