= Netta Eames =

American writer, magazine editor

- Eames in 1910
- Born: Ninetta Wiley; September 26, 1852 Wisconsin, U.S.
- Died: March 6, 1944 (aged 91) Alameda County, California, U.S.
- Occupation: Editor, short story writer and essayist
- Literary movement: Realism, Naturalism
- Spouse: Roscoe L. Eames; Edward Biron Payne; Fred Springer
- Relatives: Charmian Kittredge London (niece)

Netta Eames (September 26, 1852 – March 6, 1944) was born Ninetta Wiley, in Wisconsin on September 26, 1852. She is commonly known as Netta. She is best known as a writer and magazine editor in the late 1800s and early 1900s. As the editor of the San Francisco based Overland Monthly magazine (founded by Bret Harte), she became an early proponent of Jack London as a writer. She wrote the 1900 biography and a promotional biography of London in Overland Monthly in 1900, which helped to establish his career. Later she was his business manager and neighbor.

Netta was the aunt and foster mother of author Charmian Kittredge, whom she raised from the age of six. It was through Netta that London met Charmian, who became his lover and later his second wife. Netta also introduced London to the town of Glen Ellen, where he settled, developed a ranch, and spent his final years.

== Early years ==
Netta was born in Delhi, Wisconsin, fourteen miles outside of Oshkosh. In April 1865, as the Civil War came to an end, the Wiley family left their rural log cabin, where all the children had been born, to move west. In the 1870 United States Census, Ninetta Wiley, aged 17, lived in Santa Barbara with her parents, Jacob S. Wiley (1831–1871) and Catherine Wiley (née Growall). She was the second youngest of seven siblings, with Dayelle, Jay, Calista, Byron, and Harry, her younger brother.

== Marriage and family ==
In 1875 at age 25, Netta married Roscoe L. Eames, 30, of Maine, the business manager of the San Francisco-based magazine Overland Monthly. They lived in Berkeley at 2147 Parker Street, on the corner of Fulton. When her older sister Daisey (Dayelle) died in 1877 from consumption, Netta and Roscoe effectively adopted her sister's six-year-old daughter Charmian Kittredge and raised her as their own. Even before her death, Daisey (a minor poet) and saloon owner Captain Willard Kittredge, had been indifferent parents and Netta had already been raising the young girl, even before marrying Roscoe. After Daisy died, Williard gave Netta permission to raise Charmian as a foster parent. In 1886 Captain Kittredge became gravely ill and moved in with the Eames family but died soon after.

Netta home schooled Charmian in subjects including literature, geography, and art, resulting in a well-rounded woman with a genuine love for music and the discipline to train herself to become an accomplished pianist, organist and singer. Netta instilled the ideals of feminism, vegetarianism, socialism and a modern outlook on sexual activities. Roscoe was frequently absent and involved with other women, but he taught Charmian typing and a special technique of shorthand. She was able to type in the 120 - 150 word-per-minute range. In the late 1890s Charmian, who had worked her way through Mills College in Oakland as a typist and typing instructor, became an assistant to Netta at Overland Monthly.

Through an 1899 lunch with Netta, a 28-year-old Charmian met Jack London, several years her junior, who periodically wrote for Overland Monthly. Netta encouraged Charmian to pursue Jack, but soon after they met, Jack married his math tutor.

Charmian later wrote that Netta had been domineering and strict, but the relationship was close. Netta taught Charmian to be responsible, with a great deal of intellectual and sexual freedom, but extremely disciplined. Netta was not completely altruistic; Charmian had inherited from her parents, and some of this money was spent during her upbringing. Netta invested in the future of a child who might care for her in later years.

== Glen Ellen ==
Netta owned a resort called Wake Robin (Note: In 1902 Netta introduced Jack London to her then lover (later husband) Edward Payne, who was her partner in the Wake Robin Lodge. Payne had succeeded James Howard Bridge as the editor of the Overland Monthly in 1899, and was a co-owner of Wake Robin Lodge.) in Glen Ellen California, northwest of the town of Sonoma sitting on 10 acres between Sonoma Creek and Wildwater Creek. She invited Jack London and his family to visit in 1903, which was his introduction to Glen Ellen, where he would later buy a ranch, build a home, and where he died about 13 years later. It was on this trip that London wrote his novel The Sea Wolf and developed a relationship with Netta's niece Charmian Kittredge. She was aware of him through their prior meeting and his correspondence with Netta. London was injured when he fell from a buggy, and Netta arranged for Charmian to care for him. The two developed a friendship, as she, Netta, Roscoe, and London were politically aligned toward socialistic causes. At some point the relationship became romantic, and Jack divorced his wife to marry Charmian, who was five years his senior.

Netta and Roscoe were proponents and practitioners of open marriage and "free love". Then women's suffrage, spiritualism, and free love were strongly connected. Advocates viewed sexual freedom as an expression of self-ownership. Sex laws discriminated against women, including marriage laws and prohibitions of contraception. Netta’s and Roscoe’s openness to sexual freedom were an influence on Charmian.

In June 1905, prior to marrying Charmian, Jack bought the Hill ranch in Glen Ellen. Shortly after their marriage, the new couple took up residence nearby with Netta and Roscoe at Wake Robin, where an annex was built for them.

In 1906 Jack and Charmian decided to circumnavigate the world. Netta's husband Roscoe managed the building of a 45-foot sailing yawl, the Snark, and Roscoe signed on as the skipper. While Roscoe, Charmian, and Jack were at sea, Netta managed Jack's ranch and his business affairs. Jack also gave her power of attorney for making publishing decisions in his absence. She secured an excellent $7,000 deal for the serial publishing of Martin Eden in Pacific Monthly magazine. However, upon returning Jack was generally disappointed with her performance and some bad decisions.

Netta and Jack remained close for many years with Jack referring to her as "My Mother, Mother Mine", but toward the end of his life the relationship soured, and she actually sued him over water rights on their adjacent lands. In 1913 Jack built a dam on his ranch and reduced the flow to his neighbors including Netta. Jack won the lawsuit but died soon after.

== Subsequent marriages ==
On November 10, 1910, Netta divorced Roscoe Eames, after a two-year process based on grounds of desertion. She soon married her second husband, Vermont-born Edward Biron Payne (1847-1923), her boss and longtime lover. Jack and Charmian London attended their wedding. While Jack and Roscoe had been friends, they had a falling out during the Cruise of the Snark because Roscoe had overrepresented his experience as a seaman and his knowledge of navigation.

Payne was a Unitarian minister. In 1894, he and thirty of his followers had founded Altruria, a short-lived Utopian community in Sonoma County, California. The group published the magazine the Altrurian, which informed its supporters of the colony and sought to promote its ideals and the formation of Altrurian clubs. Several such clubs were created in the San Francisco and Los Angeles areas. In 1923, Payne died leaving Netta a widow at 70 years old.

Netta married her third husband, 72-year-old Fred Springer, in 1937 at age 85, becoming Ninetta Wiley Eames Payne Springer. Their wedding was in Eureka California. After their honeymoon in Northern California, they moved into her home at 1282 Oxford Street, Berkeley.

Netta died on March 6, 1944, at age 91 in Alameda County, California. She never had children, though she continued a close motherly relationship with Charmian throughout her life.

== Career ==
In her early work, circa 1880s, Netta wrote about Mendocino County, and collaborated with A. O. Carpenter who photographed landscapes to be published with her travel stories. Charmian became a close friend of the Carpenter twins Grace and Grant. Grace was to become “The Painter Lady” who painted the Pomo Native Americans. (Note: Grace Carpenter Hudson grew up in Ukiah with her parents, A. O. and Helen Carpenter, who ran a photography studio in their Ukiah home. She became associated with local Pomo families. Grace and her husband, ethnologist John W. Hudson documented the lives of the Pomo peoples.)

In December 1892 when Netta was 40 years old, an article she wrote about San Nicolas Island, "Three Weeks on a Weird Island", was published in Popular Monthly magazine. She had visited the island aboard the schooner Hattie, run by Captain Conlan and a crew of two others. In the party visiting the island were five passengers plus Captain Conaln and two crew members. One of the passengers, Professor Borland, “an authority on geology and archaeology”, had been hired by the California State Mining Bureau “to make a report of this island”. During the voyage, Netta's uncle, Edward Bruner, recounted his visit to see the Lone Woman of San Nicolas Island in Santa Barbara with his father in 1853 when he was a young boy.

Netta became an editor and author, and for a time a follower of Charles Keeler's “Cosmic Religion”. During the 1890s, Netta became an editor of the Overland Monthly where Roscoe worked as the business manager, and her niece Charmian helped out in her spare time by writing reviews and articles. She was the first to publish a Jack London story, and had published seven more London stories, at $7.50 per story, before she met him for lunch in 1899 (~$283.00 in 2024), with her niece Charmian, and became a promoter of his work. Her 1900 essay "Jack London" was published in Overland Monthly and was the first published biography of London.

== Publications ==
- "To Shasta's Feet", Overland Monthly, December 1887.
- "Who Died at Weissthurm?", Overland Monthly, July 1889.
- "Autumn Days in Ventura", Overland Monthly, January 1890.
- "The Mystery of Catalina", Overland Monthly, August 1890.
- "Staging through Mendocino Redwoods", Ukiah Daily Journal, 1892.
- "Three Weeks on a Weird Island", American Magazine, December 1892.
- "The Island of San Nicholas", Los Angeles Herald, 12 March 1893,.
- "The Wild and Woolly at the Fair", Overland Monthly, April 1894.
- "Arcadian Bee Ranching" Harper's Magazine, March 1896.
- "Upland Pastures" Cosmopolitan Magazine, March 1896.
- "Life's Moment", Overland Monthly, February 1888.
- "Haunts of Jack London", Cosmopolitan Magazine, November 1905.
- "The Soul of Jack London" preface, Southern Publishers, Inc., 1933.

== Bibliography ==
- Chittenden, Alice "Jack London at Home" Table Talk Magazine, June 1910.
- Davis, Susan E. "Jack London in Love", Diablo Magazine, February 2007.
- Eames, Netta "Three Weeks on a Weird Island", American Magazine, December 1892.
- Finacom, Steve (2012) "Berkeley — A Look Back: Bay ferries struggle to survive in 1937". Mercury News, August 9, 2012.
- Fletcher, W. I., and Bowker R. R. Annual Literary Index 1900, in Publishers' Weekly, New York, 1901, p. 179 (recognizes Eames as author of Jack London's biography).
- Glass, Loren (2004) "Authors Inc.: Literary Celebrity in the Modern United States, 1880-1980" New York University 2004 ISBN 0-8147-3159-7
- Kershaw, Alex (1997), Jack London: A Life, Thomas Dunne Books, 1997.
- Kittredge, Charmian (1915), The Log of the Snark, Macmillan Company, New York, 1915.
- Kittredge, Charmian (1921), The Book of Jack London, The Century Company, New York, 1921.
- Labor, Earle (2013), Jack London: An American Life, Farrar, Straus and Giroux, New York, October 1, 2013.
- Langlois, Karen S. (Spring 1990). "A Fresh Voice from the West: Mary Austin, California, and American Literary Magazines, 1892- 1910". California History.
- London, Jack, 1982, Novels and Social Writings, The Library of America. ISBN 0-940-450-06-2 .
- McAleer, Joseph, Call of the Atlantic: Jack London's Publishing Odyssey Overseas, 1902-1916, Oxford University Press, 2016.
- Nuernberg, Susan; Dunkle, I.J. (2017). "The Origins of Charmian London, Jack London's Mate-Woman".
- Rideout, Shelley (2008), Berkeley Bohemia, Gibbs Smith, Salt Lake City. 2008, pages 147, 155, 164-166, 202.
- Stasz, Clarice (2001). Jack London's Women. Amherst: Univ. of Massachusetts.
- Stasz, Clarice (2002). Biographies of Jack London. The Jack London Collection: Jean and Charles Schulz Information Center, Sonoma State University.
- Stasz, Clarice (1988)American Dreamers: Charmian and Jack London, St. Martin's, New York.
- Williams, James (Jay) W. Author Under Sail: The Imagination of Jack London, 1893-1902, University of Nebraska Press, November 2014.
