= Wolf House (Glen Ellen, California) =

Historic house in California, United States

- U.S. Historic district – Contributing property
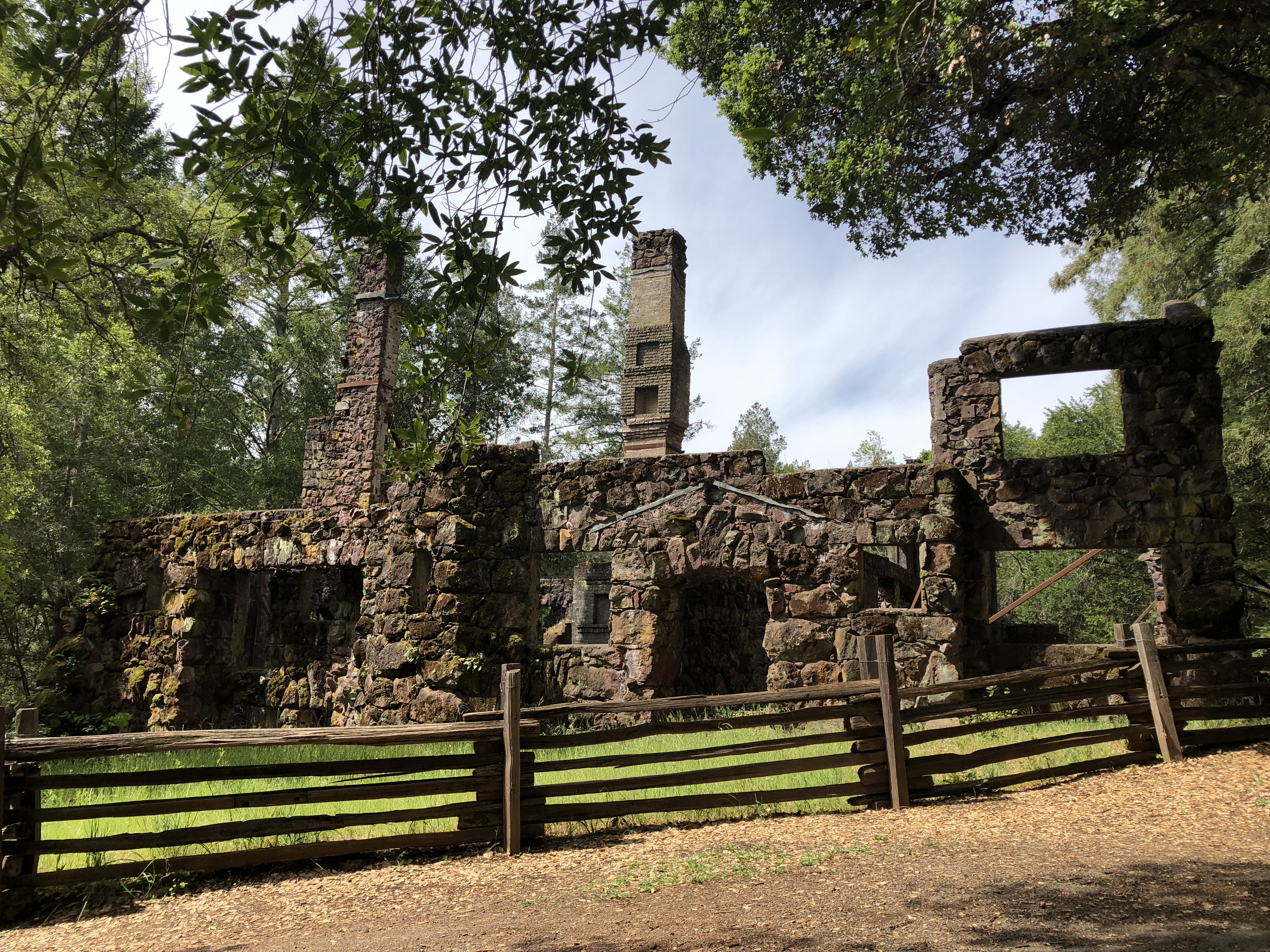
- The ruins of the Wolf House

- Location within California Location within the United States
- Nearest city: Glen Ellen, California
- Coordinates: 38°21′2″N 122°32′35″W
- Part of: Jack London State Historic Park (ID66000240)
- Added to NRHP: October 15, 1966

Wolf House was a 26-room mansion in Glen Ellen, California, built by novelist Jack London and his wife Charmian London. The house burned on August 22, 1913, shortly before the Londons were planning to move in. Stone ruins of the never-occupied home still stand, and are part of Jack London State Historic Park, which has been a National Historic Landmark since 1963.

== Planning ==
In an essay called "The House Beautiful", written in 1906 and published in his 1909 book Revolution and Other Essays, London described his ideal "dream house". He wrote that "Utility and beauty must be indissolubly wedded" and said the house must be "honest in construction, material and appearance". He described modern bathrooms, spacious and well-appointed servant's quarters, easy cleaning and maintenance, good ventilation and ample fireplaces. He predicted that he would build his dream house in seven to ten years.

London had purchased a 130-acre (53 ha) farm in the Sonoma Valley in about 1905. He later purchased several adjoining parcels, increasing the size of the farm to approximately 1,200 acres (490 ha). About one third was cultivated, and two thirds was wooded hillsides. He called the property "Wonder Ranch".

== Design ==
London hired San Francisco architect Albert L. Farr to design the home. Farr was a leading exponent of Arts and Crafts architecture in California. The design was described as "rustic and individualistic", and featured a library measuring 19 by 40 feet (5.8 by 12.2 m), and a living room two stories high measuring 18 by 58 feet (5.5 by 17.7 m). In response to London's wish for modern amenities, Farr's plans included a water heater, electric lighting, refrigeration, a built-in vacuum cleaning system, laundry facilities including a "steam dryer rotary wringer", and a wine cellar. Mindful of the severe damage caused by the 1906 San Francisco earthquake, London and Farr incorporated great strength and durability into the design of the structure.

A 1987 study by a group of architectural historians said that Wolf House "can be thought of as a combination of one of Greene and Greene's 'ultimate bungalows' of Southern California and one of the great lodges of the Adirondack mountains".

The house was 15,000 square feet (1,400 m^{2}), with 26 rooms and nine fireplaces.

== Construction ==
Construction began late in 1910 as stones were blasted and trees cut. London hired Italian stonemason Natale Forni (1871–1948) as foreman for the project. He also hired his older sister Eliza London Shepard (1867–1939) as his ranch superintendent, and she was involved in the day-to-day management of the construction.

The structure of the home was built of five primary materials, all obtained locally: Coast Redwood logs with bark intact, boulders, chunks of volcanic rock blasted out of the ground and otherwise unquarried, blue slate, and concrete.

== Fire ==
Construction of Wolf House was almost complete and the Londons were planning to move in when a fire began late on the night of August 22, 1913. The fire spread rapidly and gutted the interior of the house, although the massive masonry walls remained standing. The red tile roof collapsed into the interior. Although arson was suspected, no strong evidence was ever discovered.

The fire had a profound effect on those most involved in the project. Jack's sister Eliza wept that night. Charmian London later wrote that Eliza was "scarred to her soul" and that the foreman Forni was "like a father who had lost his child, and in danger of losing his reason". His wife also wrote that "the razing of his house killed something in Jack, and he never ceased to feel the tragic inner sense of loss".

== Aftermath ==
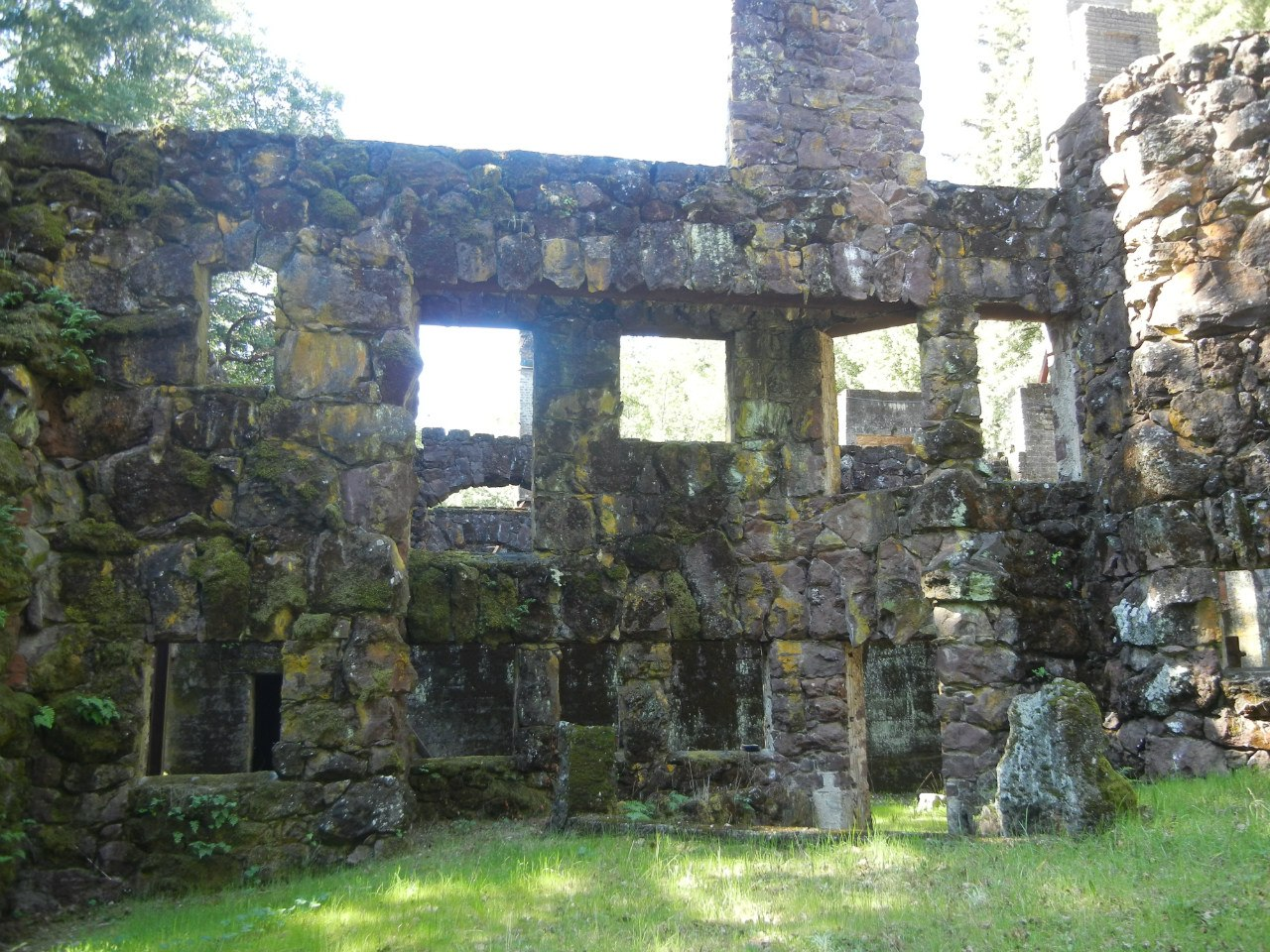
Wolf House ruins

Financial losses were estimated at $35,000 to $40,000. London had several insurance policies on the home, and collected $10,000 in claims. The National Union Fire Insurance Company later featured a thank you letter written by London in an advertising campaign.

Jack London pledged to rebuild the house, and his workers began to cut fresh redwood logs, which had to be dried and cured for 18 months before reconstruction could begin. However, London's health declined, and he died three years and three months after the fire, on November 22, 1916.

Charmian London continued living at Beauty Ranch until her death in 1955, settling eventually into a home she called "The House of Happy Walls", about half a mile (800 m) from the Wolf House ruins. There she protected her husband's legacy and wrote a biography of him. Her home is now a museum. Both Jack and Charmian London are buried at Beauty Ranch, as is Jack's sister Eliza.

Heirs of the London family donated the property to the State of California in 1960. The Wolf House ruins were designated a California Historical Landmark in 1959, and a National Historic Landmark in 1963. Steel bracing was added to the masonry structure in 1965 to prevent deterioration. Although the interior of the ruins is fenced off, visitors can walk up to the exterior walls of the structure. Wolf House was one of the first ones to be added to the National Register of Historic Places on October 15, 1966, because of the National Historic Preservation Act of 1966 which was signed that same day.

In 1995, a forensic analysis of the cause of the fire was completed by a team of ten experts led by Robert N. Anderson, a retired engineering professor from San Jose State University. Various possible causes were ruled out. The day had been very hot, but there was no lightning. The investigators found no evidence of arson, or of an electrical fire, since the generator had not been installed. Instead, they identified spontaneous combustion as the most likely cause. Earlier on the day the fire started, a linseed oil finish was being applied to the "magnificent" oak and walnut interior cabinets and woodwork. Workers had previously been rebuked for carelessness with the flammable finishing materials. The fire probably started in oil-soaked cotton rags, in the ground floor dining room, below the library and Jack London's work room. Some of the windows had not yet been installed, allowing free air flow to feed the fire. The fire probably ignited the wood floor first, then spread to the wood wall paneling. By the time the fire was discovered, it was out of control.

== In popular culture ==
In the series Heroes of Olympus by Rick Riordan, the Wolf House is the location where demigods (children of Roman gods) are sent to begin their training with the she-wolf (named Lupa in the series) before being sent to Camp Jupiter, the Roman equivalent of the Greek Camp Half-Blood.
