= Eric Jackson =

Eric Jackson may refer to:

- Eric Jackson (journalist) (born 1952), Panamanian politician, journalist, and radio talk show host
- Eric Jackson (kayaker) (born 1964), freestyle kayaker, kayak designer, and founder of Jackson Kayak
- Eric M. Jackson, president of World Ahead Publishing and former PayPal VP of marketing
- Eric Jackson, American professional wrestler
- Eric Jackson (mayor) (born 1959), mayor of Trenton, New Jersey
- Eric Jackson, character in List of The 100 characters
