= The Cruise of the Snark =

1911 book by Jack London

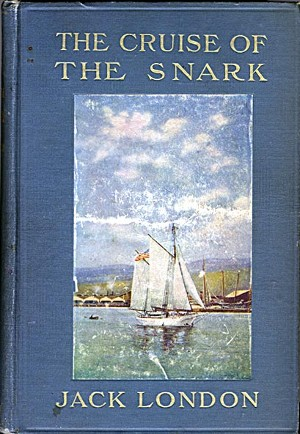
- First edition
- Author: Jack London
- Language: English
- Genre: Non-fiction
- Publisher: Macmillan
- Publication date: 1911

The Cruise of the Snark is a 1911 illustrated non-fiction book by Jack London chronicling his sailing adventure in 1907 across the south Pacific in his ketch the Snark. Accompanying London on this voyage was his wife Charmian London and a small crew. London taught himself celestial navigation and the basics of sailing and of boats during the course of this adventure and describes these details to the reader. He visits exotic locations including the Solomon Islands and Hawaii, and his first-person accounts and photographs provide insight into these remote places at the beginning of the 20th century.

== About the Snark ==
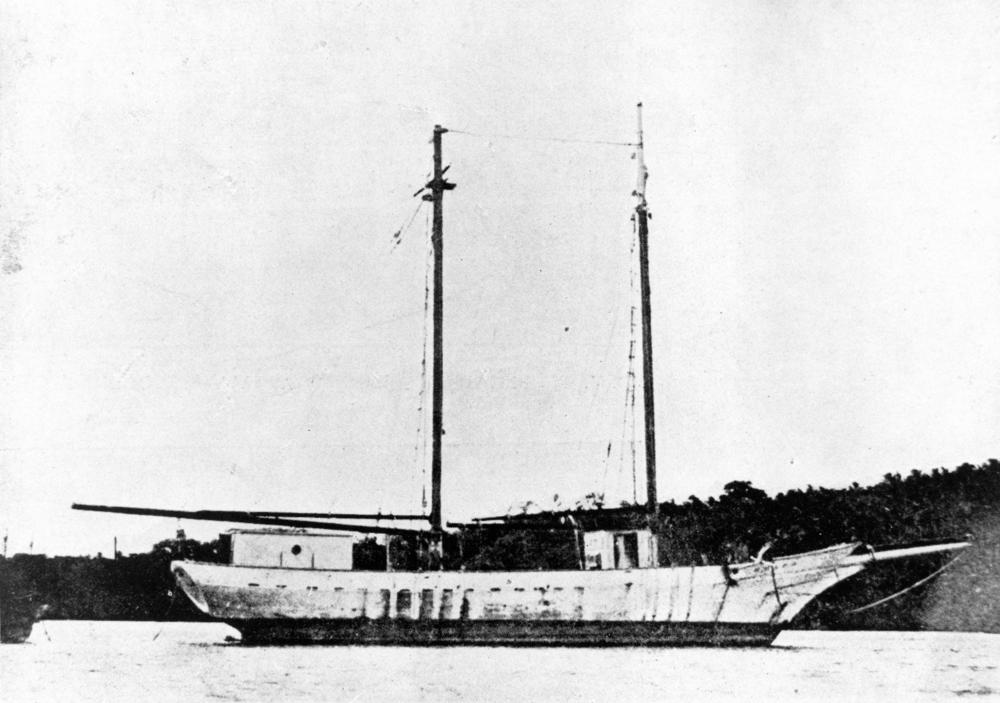
The Snark, February 19, 1921

In 1906, Jack London began to build a 45-foot yacht on which he planned a round-the-world voyage, to last seven years.

The Snark was named after Lewis Carroll's 1876 poem The Hunting of the Snark. She had two masts and was 45 feet long at the waterline and 55 feet on deck, and London claimed to have spent thirty thousand dollars on her construction. She was primarily sail power; however, she also had an auxiliary 70-horsepower engine. She carried one lifeboat.

After many delays, Jack and Charmian London and a small crew sailed out of San Francisco Bay on April 23, 1907, bound for the South Pacific.

Caption: "The Nature Man comes on Board the Snark", p. 180

One of London's crew members was young Martin Johnson from Kansas. Following the cruise of the Snark, Martin became an adventurer and world traveler, making some of the earliest motion pictures of unexplored or less-explored areas and peoples of the earth.

The anchor, banister ropes, and oars from Snark were incorporated into the Los Feliz estate of conductor John A. Van Pelt built in the 1930s. The anchor from Snark was made into a chandelier and the oars were used as balcony beams.

== Locations visited by the Snark ==
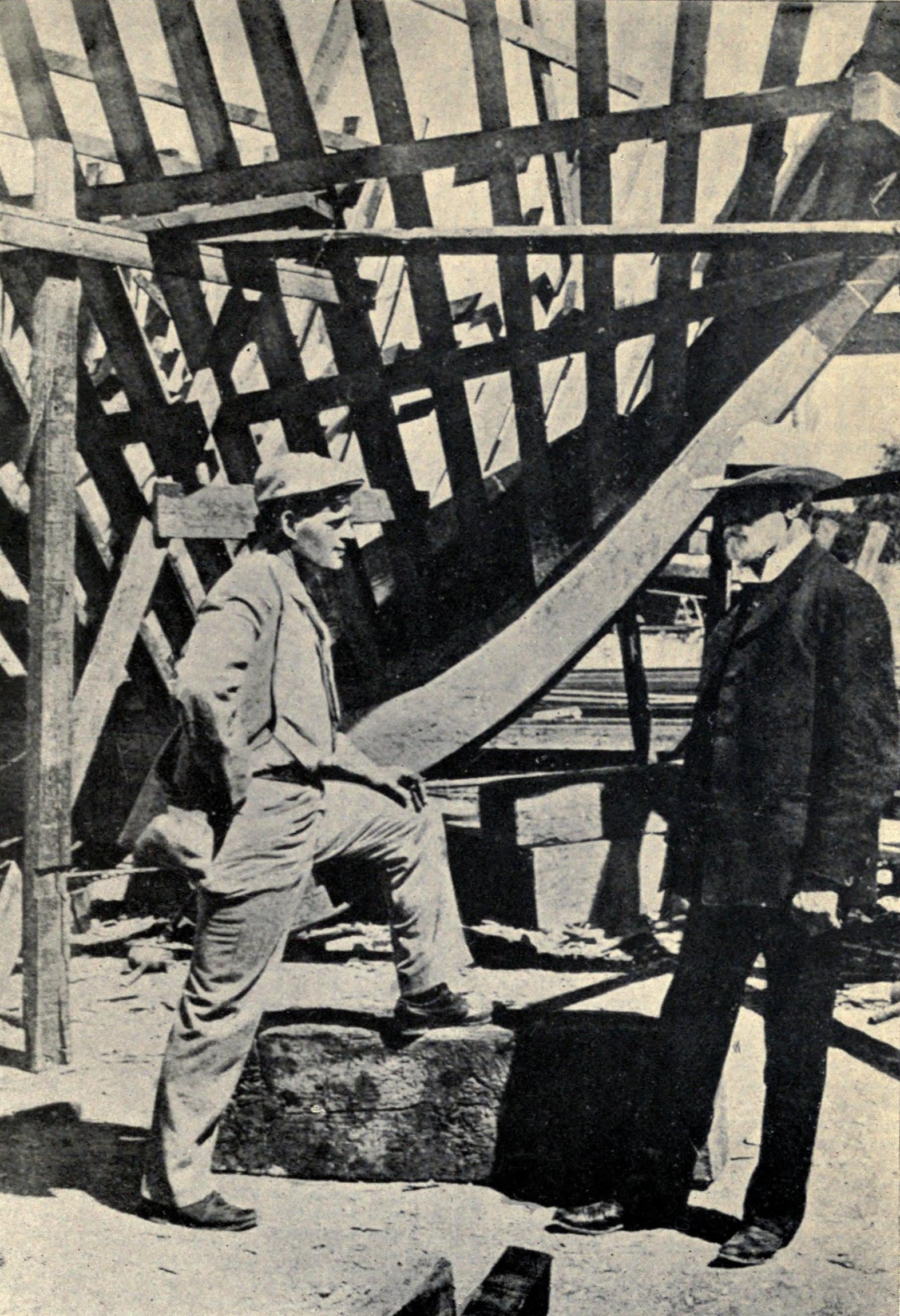
Jack London at the building of the Snark in 1906.

- San Francisco – The Snark first set sail out of San Francisco on April 23, 1907 following construction and several months of delay.
- Hawaii – While in Hawaii, London learned the "Royal Sport" of surfing, visited the Leper colony on Molokai and traveled by horseback on Maui up and across Haleakala and to Hana.
- Marquesas Islands including the island of Taiohee
- Tahiti including the town of Papeete, and the islands of Raiatea,
- Bora Bora
- Fiji
- Samoa
- Solomon Islands, Malaita, Langa Langa Lagoon, Laulasi Island
- Australia

The Londons ended their voyage at Guadalcanal in the Solomon Islands and travelled to Sydney on the steamer SS Makambo. Jack spent five weeks in a hospital recovering from infections and illness. A skeleton crew brought the Snark from the Solomons to Australia where she was sold for a fraction of the build-costs. The Londons departed Australia on the SS Tymeric, bound for Ecuador April 8, 1909.

== Media coverage ==
London's voyage garnered some media attention from the point when he first set out into the Pacific. Concern was raised that the Snark might be lost when London failed to arrive in the Marquesas Islands on schedule.

== Related works ==
Jack London's The Lepers of Molokai first appeared as articles in the Woman's Home Companion (1908) and the Contemporary Review (1909). Additional essays from the voyage also appeared in The Pacific Monthly and Harper's Weekly prior to publication of the Cruise of the Snark.

Charmian Kittredge London subsequently wrote three books detailing their adventures aboard the Snark and their extended visits in Hawaii:

- The Log of the Snark (1915)
- Our Hawaii (1917)
- Our Hawaii: Islands and Islanders (1917)

These works provide daily details on the activities of the crew. A comparison with Jack London's book reveals how he highlighted episodes of most interest to his readers, such as surfing. Charmian London's books reveal much more description of the cultures they encountered, along with criticism of the effects of colonization. Tucker notes how Charmian distinguishes her accounts from prior women travelog writers in being the sole woman with an all-male crew. This leads to her close reading of gender and hierarchies throughout the voyage.
