= Charmian London =

American writer (1871–1955)

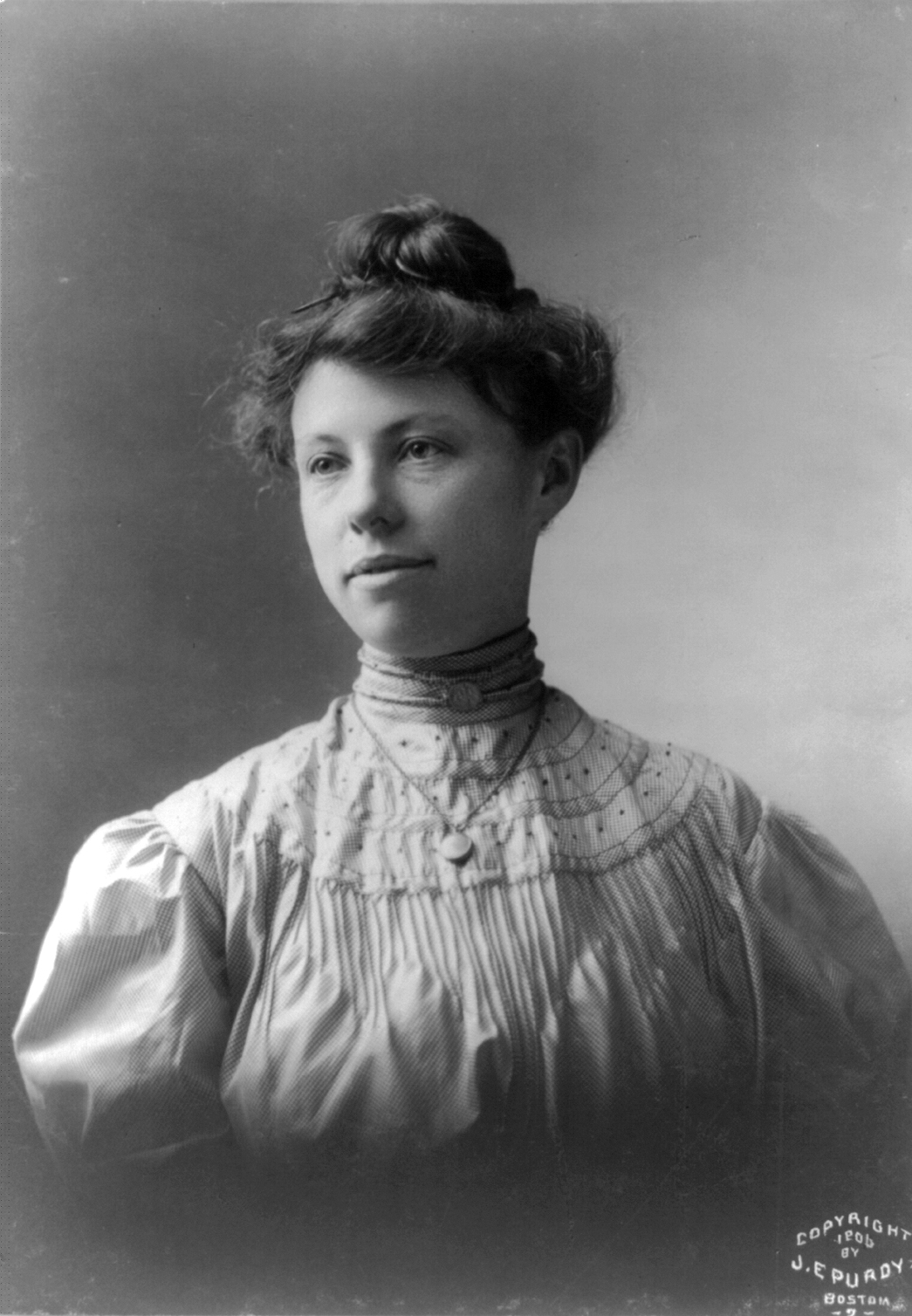
- London in 1905; photo by James E. Purdy
- Born: Charmian Kittredge; November 27, 1871; Wilmington, California, U.S.
- Died: January 14, 1955 (aged 83); Glen Ellen, California, U.S.
- Spouse: Jack London (m. 1905; died 1916)

Charmian London (née Kittredge; November 27, 1871 – January 14, 1955) was an American writer and the second wife of Jack London.

== Early life ==
"Clara" Charmian Kittredge was born to poet and writer Dayelle "Daisy" Wiley and California hotelier Willard "Kitt" Kittredge at a railroad outpost south of Los Angeles. Her mother died in 1877 when Charmian was six years old. Charmian's father sent her to Oakland, California, where she was raised by her aunt, Ninetta "Netta" Wiley Eames and husband Roscoe Eames, who had no children of their own. A writer and editor, Netta Wiley taught Charmian at home, emphasizing literature, the fine arts, and piano. A business manager, Eames taught her shorthand, typing and accounting.

When the Eames household moved to Berkeley, California, Charmian became exposed to leaders in the Arts and Crafts movement, which shaped her aesthetics. Lectures given by University of California professors introduced her to modern literature and philosophy. She also was a part of the intellectual circle that surrounded the Overland Monthly. In 1897, she participated in a three-day horseback ride to Yosemite, where she joined a group of celebrated scientists, painters, photographers, political leaders, and founders of the Sierra Club. Believing in free love, the Eameses encouraged an attitude toward sexuality as pleasurable and guilt-free. By adolescence, Charmian was typical of the New Woman emerging to counter traditional feminine roles.

Charmian inherited funds from both sides of her family. These enabled further education at Mills College, where she concentrated on a non-degree program of literature, the arts, and philosophy. She also worked as secretary to the school's co-founder and later president, Susan Tolman Mills. In the 1890s, she worked for Harding and Forbes, a shipping firm in San Francisco, California, during a time when middle-class women stayed at home and few women worked in offices. She learned photography and published some images. An avid horseback rider, she created a split skirt to ride astride, this during a time women rode sidesaddle. She also accompanied vocalists and string players at local concerts. She befriended Grace Hudson, and posed for some of her artwork. A European tour in 1901 furthered her appreciation of the fine arts and music. Before traveling to Europe, she visited Mt. Desert Island, to meet the Kittredge side of her family.

== Marriage and writing career ==
Charmian met Jack London in March 1900 during a luncheon at Young's restaurant with Netta Wiley Eames, who was working on an article for the Overland Monthly on Jack London. By this time, Charmian was now working for E. Mickle and Company, one of the largest shipping firms in San Francisco. She had an assistant who reported to her. Five years younger than Charmian, London found her literary knowledge impressive and admired her support for Socialism. They met on several occasions at Charmian's home in Berkeley to discuss literature including the works Tess of the d'Urbervilles, The Forest Lovers, and Flood-Tide. A month later London married Elizabeth "Bess" Maddern, with whom he had two children.

During this time Charmian began her own writing career. She published non-fiction essays, including a plea for women to quit riding sidesaddle. She also became part of Jack's social circle of Bohemian artists and writers known as The Crowd and started attending their weekly gatherings at the Londons' home. According to Joseph Noel, it was at one of these gatherings in 1902 that Jack first kissed Charmian. During this time Jack also became enamored of Anna Strunsky, a Socialist who co-authored his epistolary novel The Kempton-Wace Letters.

In the summer of 1903, London took his family to a resort in Glen Ellen, California, Wake Robin, then owned by Netta Wiley Eames. Jack left his family to take a short sailing trip but was injured in a buggy ride. Bess Maddern asked Charmian, living nearby, to look in on him. The result was a long secret love affair that led to divorce. The new couple married in Chicago on November 19, 1905. Charmian supported the honeymoon including Jack lecturing on Socialism. A trip to Jamaica and a recently independent Cuba followed, during which she photographed the island landscape.

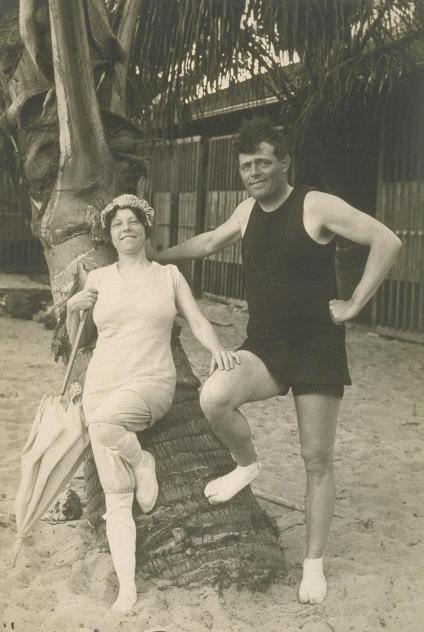
Jack and Charmian London on the beach in Hawaii, 1915

The couple settled at Wake Robin and developed a plan to buy land on Sonoma Mountain for ranching. Upon re-reading Joshua Slocum's Sailing Alone Around the World, they decided to repeat the journey. The trip on the Snark, designed by Jack, went only to Australia, yet provided the material for books by both writers. Charmian published articles for Mid-Pacific Magazine, along with The Log of the Snark (1915), and Our Hawaii (1917), The Log was well received by reviewers, who described the book as "clever, lucid, conversational, emotionally revealing, and humorous." Our Hawaii reflected upon the changes in the island between 1907 and 1916 to deplore the rapid changes brought about by tourism.

Charmian played a direct role in her husband's writings as well. First, she was the model for many of his fictional characters, such as Saxon in The Valley of the Moon, Lute in Planchette, and Paula in The Little Lady of the Big House. Although London portrayed New Women prior to marrying Charmian, these and other characters incorporated full dimensions of his wife's character. Latest scholarship reveals Charmian was a collaborator as well on many of Jack's books, including The Valley of the Moon and The Mutiny of Elsinore. Often described as London's typist, she was also his editor. In that regard, she shared his intentions, by deleting material inconsistent with his purpose and by suggesting changes in structure. Even more, she contributed passages, most notably descriptions, her forte. Both the original manuscripts and her diaries document her full involvement in many of his writings.

She was an active partner in the Beauty Ranch, their spread on Sonoma Mountain in Glen Ellen. The intention was a self-sufficient and sustainable source of food products. Jack's stepsister, Eliza London Shepard, managed activities under his direction. Charmian's main interest was animal husbandry. She participated in the choice of stock for breeding and was known for her intuitive eye, notably with regard to horses. The couple won top awards at the California State Fair for their breeds.

Charmian and Jack had no children who survived them. A daughter, Joy, died soon after birth and several other pregnancies ended in miscarriage.

== Later life ==
Jack died of uremia and renal colic in 1916, bequeathing nearly his entire estate to Charmian, while leaving token amounts to his first wife and their children.

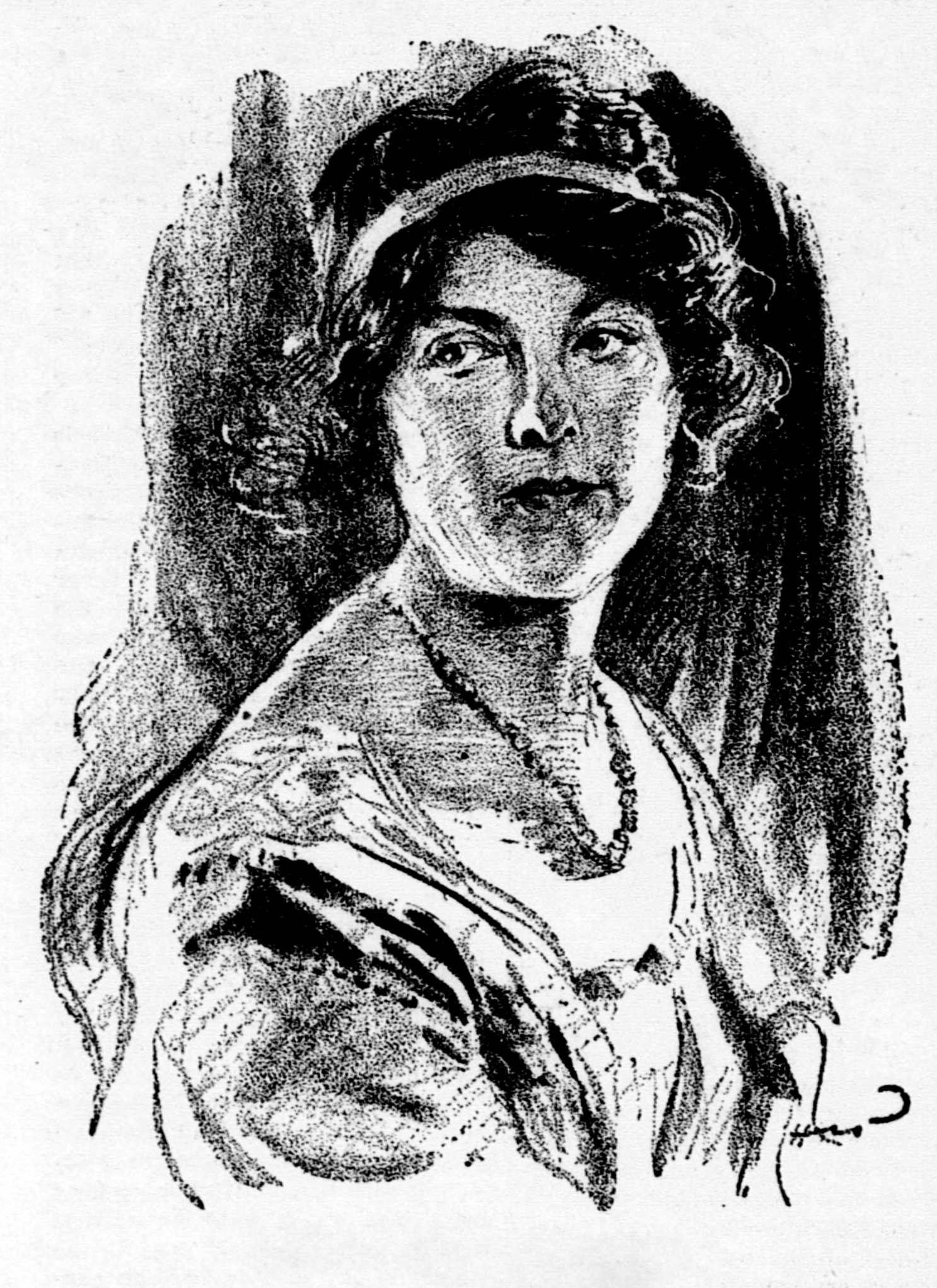
Charmian Kittredge London c. 1922

Following Jack's death, Charmian joined Eliza Shepard in saving their home the Beauty Ranch. She completed sales of screenplay rights with filmmakers. She also wrote prefaces to his writings that were published posthumously, including Dutch Courage and Other Stories (1922). She completed his unfinished novel Cherry for Cosmopolitan magazine. Perhaps her most significant activity to publicize London's works was trips abroad to arrange good translations and protect copyrights. As a result, she ensured his writings would become published worldwide and spread his reputation accordingly.

As part of her marketing London's name, Charmian published The Book of Jack London (two volumes) (1921). Scholars consider the book to be an important if sometimes flawed source of biographical information. One biographer calls it "an uneven account that omits Jack's illegitimacy, yet has surprisingly frank information nonetheless concerning his personality."

Charmian wrote nonfiction as well. Key themes were travel, animal protection and prisoner rights. Our Hawaii: Islands and Islanders updated her earlier version by including more of her husband's views, along with her praise for the original island culture.

Aware her Book of Jack London was neither comprehensive nor unbiased, Charmian searched for an experienced biographer to prepare a comprehensive study. This led in 1935 to her inviting Irving Stone to the ranch to study the extensive collection of letters and documents needed for the work. Discovering he went into some of her hidden diaries and love letters, Charmian evicted him from the ranch. His Sailor on Horseback earned reviewer criticism for lifting material from London's fiction as fact, emphasis upon excessive womanizing, and failures as a writer and rancher. Charmian and Eliza Shepard were shocked to read the claim Jack had committed suicide. The publishers brought out the second edition with the subtitle A Biographical Novel. In response to Stone's version, Charmian supported stepdaughter Joan London. Her Jack London and His Times emphasized her father's Socialist writings and activities. As a further block on Stone's book, Charmian arranged screenplay rights of her biography. Jack London featured in 1943, starring Michael O'Shea as Jack and Susan Hayward as Charmian.

Frank about sexuality, which she believed was a source of energy and transcendence, in widowhood Charmian sought brief encounters. Although most cited was her relationship with Harry Houdini, she was not exclusive during the few periods they met. Her longest and most emotional relationship was with Frederick O'Brien, then a popular writer of South Sea travel accounts. She was discreet with her many lovers to protect her public reputation, and by implication, that of Jack London.

Long afflicted by high blood pressure, by 1947 Charmian was often bedridden following repeated strokes. She died in 1955, at the age of 83. Her ashes rest beside her husband Jack's under the rock that marks their grave near Glen Ellen, California at Jack London State Historic Park.
