= Jack London State Historic Park =

Historic house in California, United States

- Jack London Ranch
- U.S. National Register of Historic Places
- U.S. National Historic Landmark
- California Historical Landmark
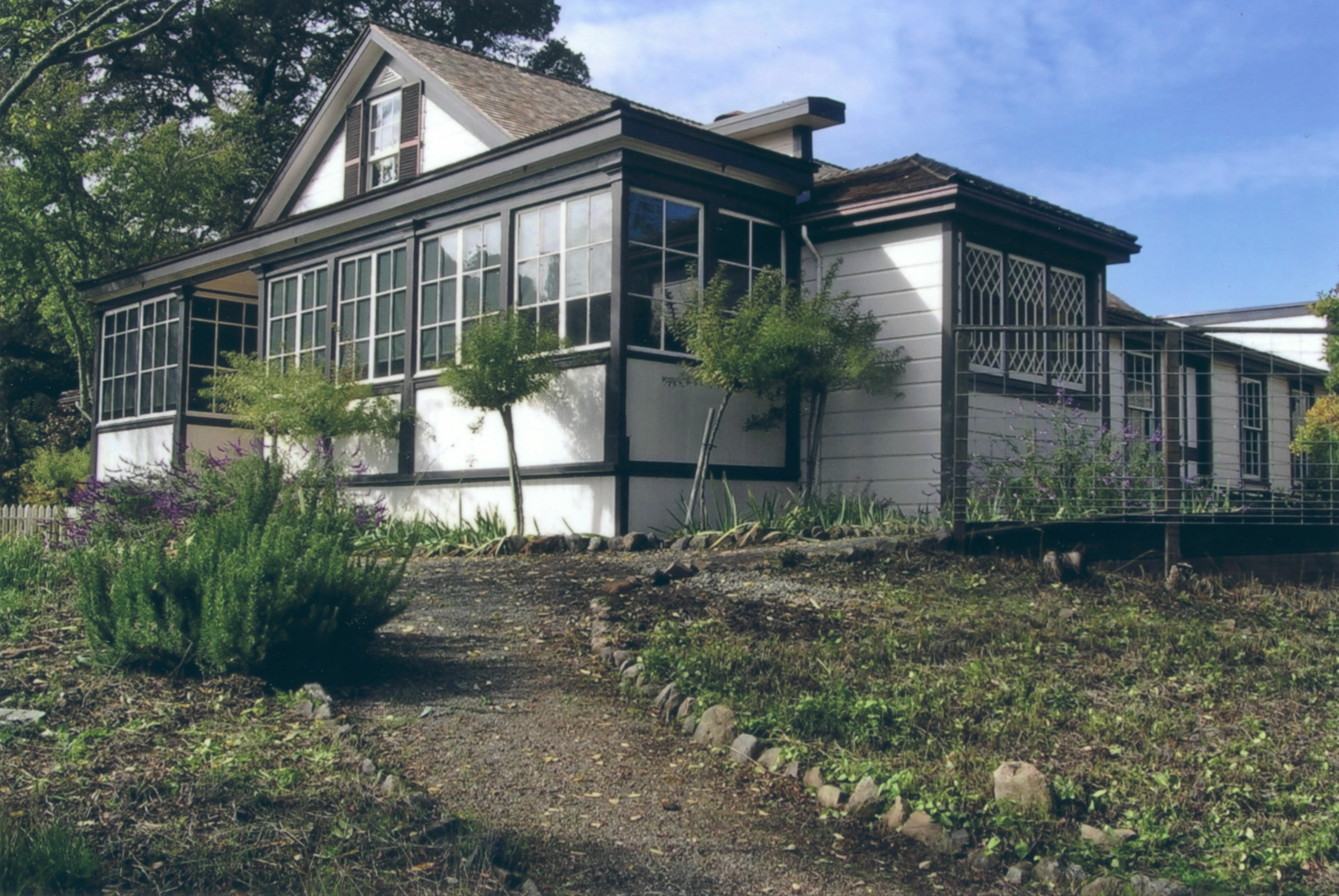

- Location within California Location within the United States
- Nearest city: Glen Ellen, California
- Coordinates: 38°21′2″N 122°32′35″W
- Area: 47.5 acres (192,000 m^{2})
- NRHP reference No.: 66000240
- CHISL No.: 743

Significant dates
- Added to NRHP: October 15, 1966
- Designated NHL: December 29, 1962
- Designated CHISL: July 5, 1960

Jack London State Historic Park, also known as Jack London Home and Ranch, is a California State Historic Park near Glen Ellen, California, United States, situated on the eastern slope of Sonoma Mountain. It includes the ruins of a house burned a few months before Jack London and family were to move in, a cottage in which they had lived, another house built later, and the graves of Jack London and his wife. The property is both a California Historical Landmark and a National Historic Landmark.

The Jack London home, called the Wolf House, is a sizable stone structure, which was destroyed by fire and whose ruins are visible within the state park property. The sloping terrain of the park has a considerable occurrence of Goulding clay loam soils, particularly in the lower reaches.

== History ==
Jack London State Historic Park was occupied by a winery called Kohler & Frohling. Jack London purchased the property when it was abandoned in 1905 with hopes of becoming a rancher. He named it Beauty Ranch. While London was there, he expanded the small cottage to 3,000 square feet (279 square meters) and converted the stone house next to it into a study where London would write his works. Between 1909 and 1911, London bought more land to expand his ranch.

In 1910, he began work on his mansion on his ranch called the Wolf House. Jack and Charmian spent more than $80,000 in pre-World War I money on the house. It was to be 15,000 square feet (1,393 square meters), have custom made furniture and decorations, and feature a reflection pool stocked with mountain bass. On August 22, 1913, while the Londons were away from their ranch, they received word that their new mansion was on fire. By the time they got there the building was completely overtaken by the fire, and it was too late to save the house.

London was devastated after the fire burnt down the house that he never got to live in. This put London in debt and forced him to literally work to death, as he tried to earn enough money to run his ranch and have a good lifestyle.

On November 22, 1916, London died of a cause that is still disputed today. He wished to be cremated and have his ashes interred on the property. He also stated that he wanted to be buried near the pioneer children on a hill underneath a rock from the Wolf House, which was just down the road.

=== After Jack London ===
After Jack London died, his wife Charmian inherited the property. During that time she built a house on the land called the House of Happy Walls, which is a smaller version of the Wolf House. Charmian lived there until her death in 1955. Jack's half-sister Eliza Shepard superintended Beauty Ranch until her own death in 1939; her grandson Milo Shepard later inherited the same role. Charmian died in 1955 and, by 1959, the land and its structures were given to the state of California with the help of Eliza's son Irving Shepard and his wife Mildred. The next year, 1960, the property was declared a California Historical Landmark and a National Historic Landmark in 1962. On September 24, 1960, the new state park hosted an opening dedication ceremony that included a speech by the Londons' friend Anna Strunsky.

Today, more than 800 acres of London's Beauty Ranch have been preserved. The site is owned by the California State Parks system, and operated by Valley of the Moon Natural History Assn. DBA Jack London Park Partners

The park has been entrusted to the Valley of the Moon Natural History Association (VMNHA) due to the statewide budget problems experienced in 2012. The California State Park system is breaking new ground by allowing private non-profit groups to operate State Parks slated for closure.

The Winery ruins next to the cottage were host to the Transcendence Theatre Company's benefit performance on Saturday, October 1, 2011, for the VMNHA. The Theatre Company planned to partner with the VMNHA to produce a concert series in summer of 2012 which would also benefit the Annadel, Sugarloaf Ridge, and Jack London State Parks.

== Park features ==
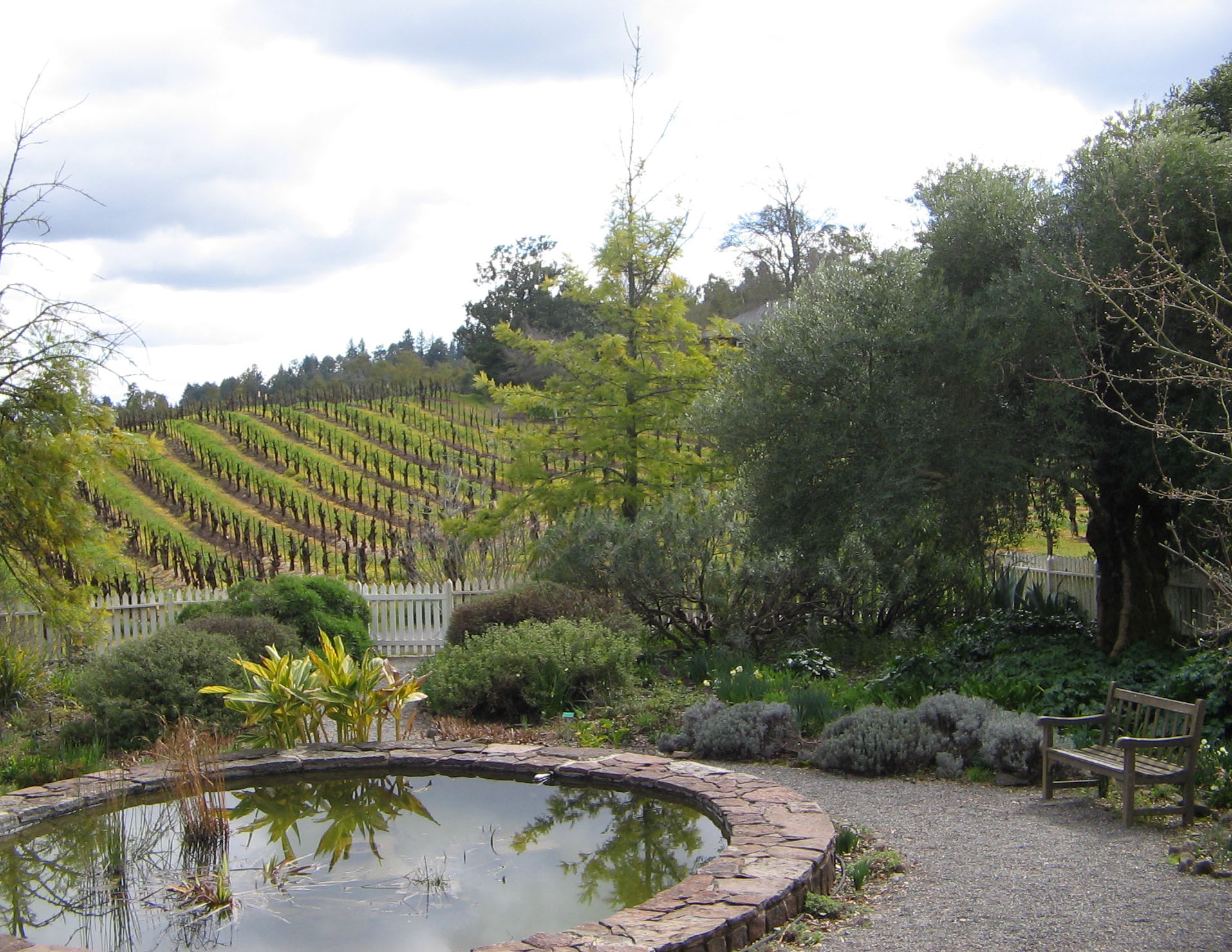
The garden as seen from the cottage porch

=== Winery Cottage ===
The Winery Cottage was the main living quarters throughout London's time on the ranch, and the location where many of his visitors stayed. London bought it in 1911 and expanded it later that year. London further expanded by adding a west wing to the cottage, which served as a study where he wrote many of his stories. London died in this cottage, on the sunporch, on November 22, 1916.

=== House of Happy Walls ===
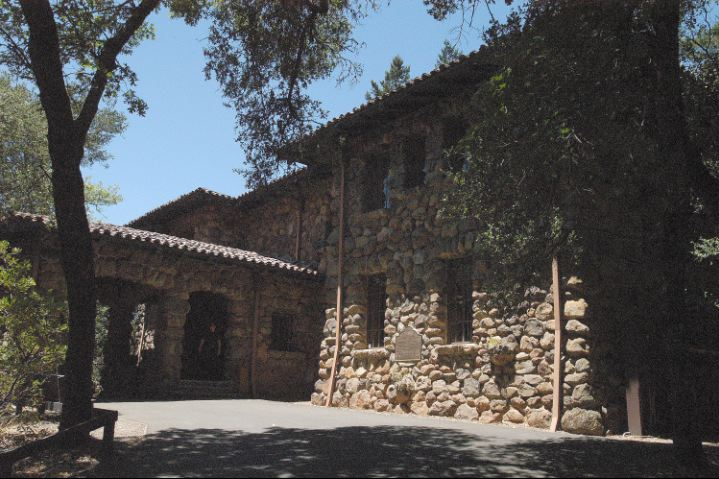
The House of Happy Walls

Charmian London constructed The House of Happy Walls in 1919, in memory of Jack. It is a smaller and a more formal version of the Wolf House, and much of its furniture was originally intended for use in the Wolf House. Charmian lived in The House of Happy Walls until her death in 1955. In her will, written in 1938, she asked that the various properties of Beauty Ranch become a museum open to the public but was especially concerned about the House of Happy Walls: "In case of my death, it is my wish that my home, 'House of Happy Walls' is not to be lived in by anyone except a caretaker. This building & its arrangements are peculiarly an expression of myself and its ultimate purpose is that of a museum to Jack London & myself. It can be used for the purpose of revenue." Today the building serves as the visitor center and a museum for Jack London State Historic Park.

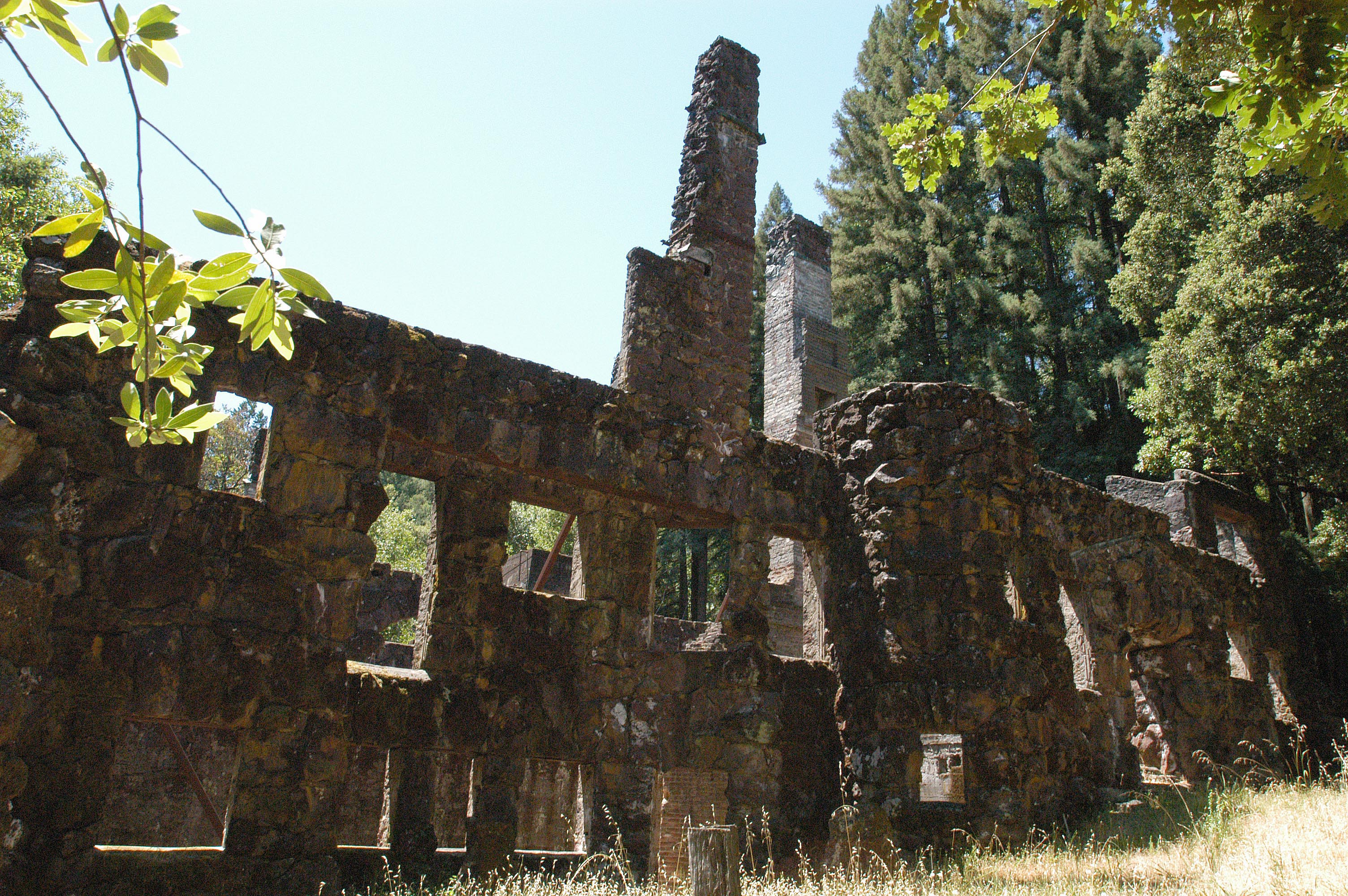
Wolf House ruins

=== Wolf House ===
The Wolf House is an unfinished property that was intended to be the main residence of the Londons. Construction on the 15,000 square foot (1,393 square meters) house began in 1910. Its design included only materials native to the area, a reflection pool stocked with mountain bass, and custom made furniture. The house was nearly complete in 1913, but before the Londons got to move in, the house burnt down on August 22 of that year. The ruins still stand today. Losses were estimated at $35,000 to $40,000 but the Londons collected only $10,000 in insurance claims. They pledged to rebuild the house and workers began drying redwood logs in preparation. Jack was in poor health, however, and he died in 1916 before the wood was ready. Construction halted with his death.

=== Jack and Charmian London's grave ===
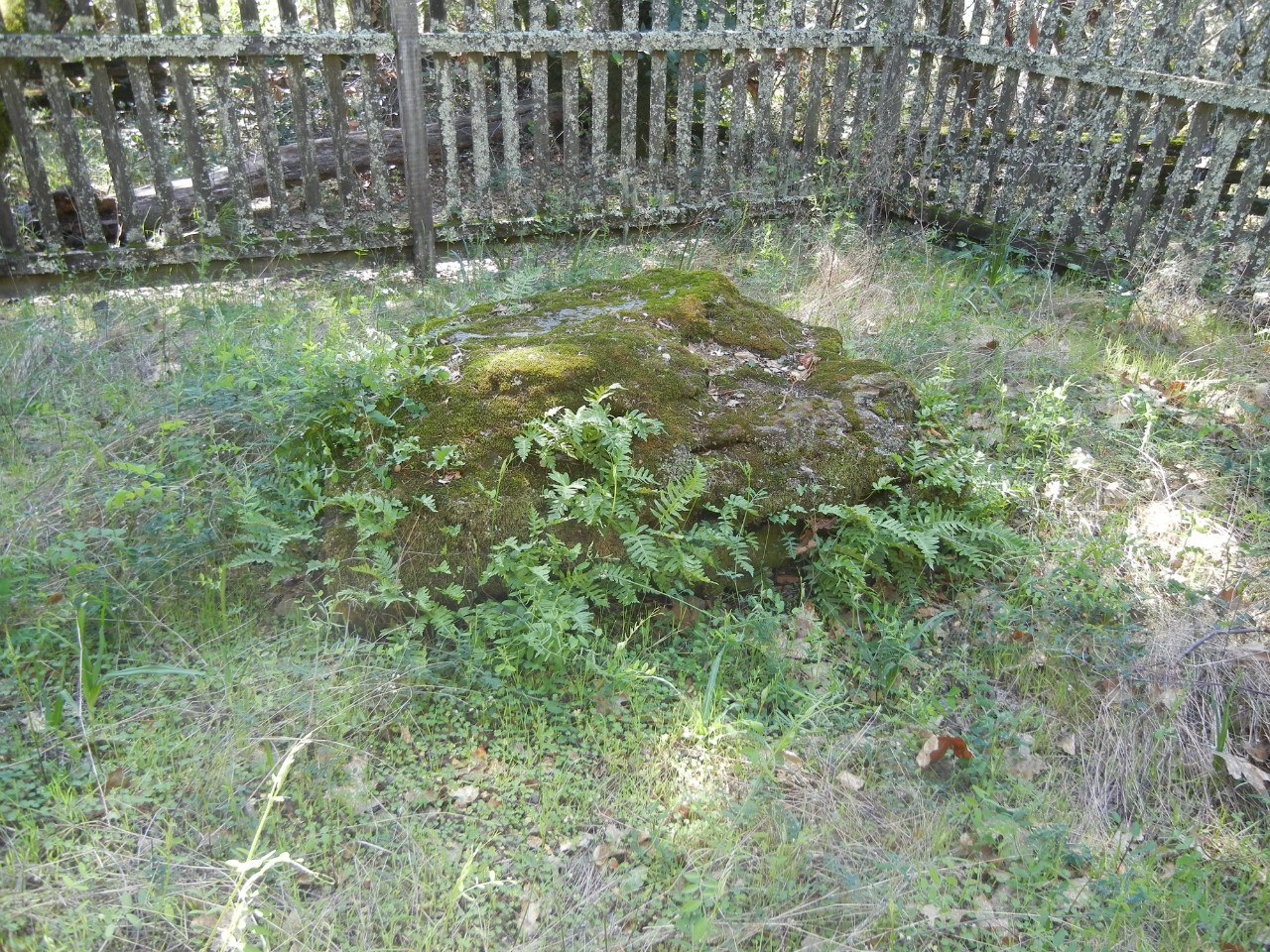
Grave of Jack and Charmian London

Jack and Charmian London are both buried on the property not far from the Wolf House. After his earlier funeral in Oakland, Jack's ashes were spread at sunset on November 26, 1916, at this small knoll overlooking the Valley of the Moon. Charmian, Jack's sister Eliza, and a few workers were the only people in attendance. In accordance with his wishes, his ashes were laid next to some pioneer children, under a rock that belonged to the Wolf House. After Charmian's death in 1955, she was also cremated and then buried with her husband in the same simple spot that her husband chose.

== See also ==
- Fairfield Osborn Preserve
- Graham Creek
- Pomo
- Sonoma Valley
