= Rancheros visitadores =

American social club

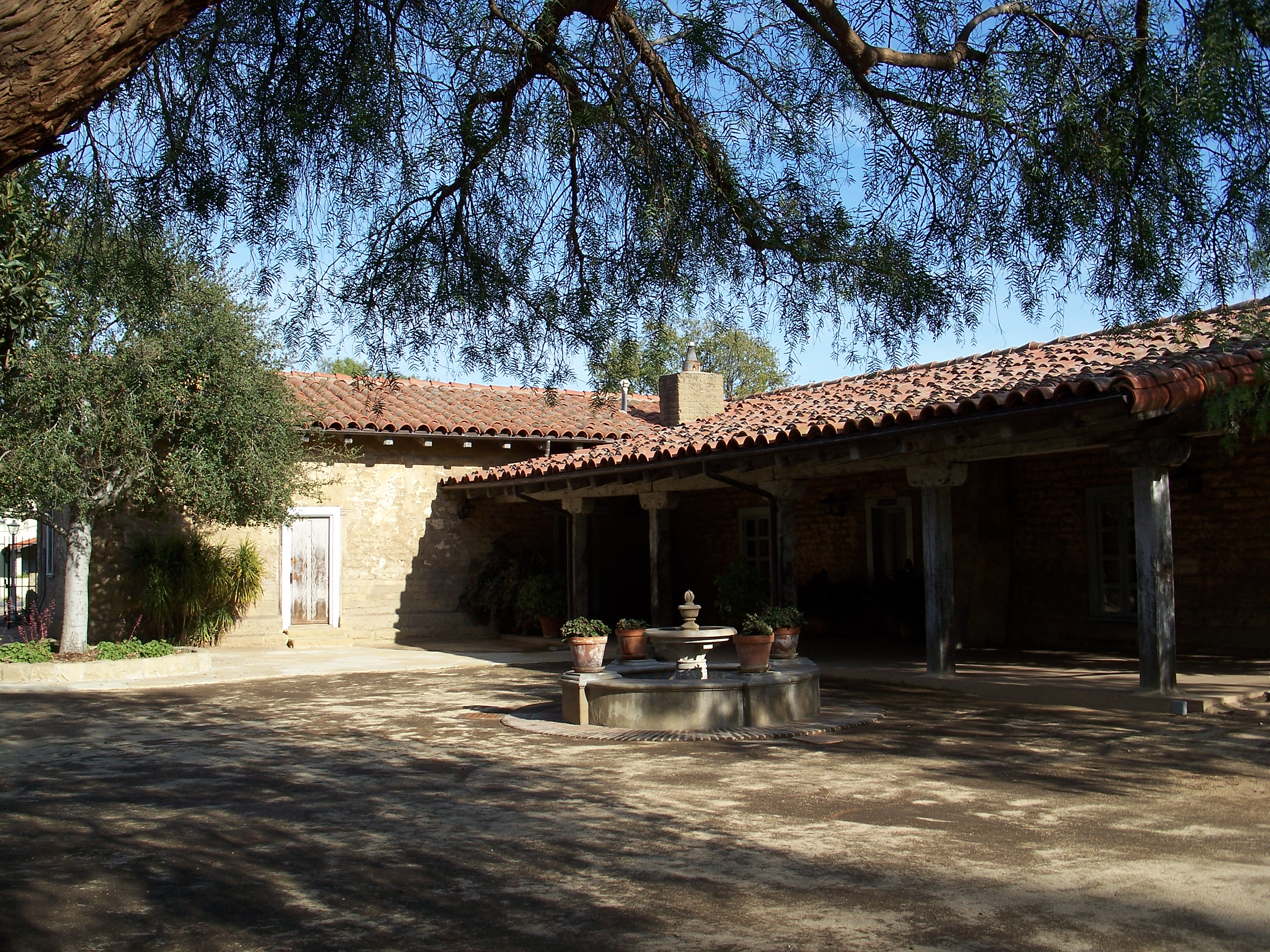
Covarrubias Adobe, the Los Rancheros Visitadores clubhouse

Los Rancheros Visitadores or the "Visiting Ranchers" is a social club in the United States. The group meets on ranch land in Santa Barbara and embarks northward on a 60-mile (97 km) journey across the countryside after receiving a blessing at the Santa Ynez Mission. It attracts over 700 riders on its annual trek.

It was founded by the banker and United Airlines co-founder Jack Mitchell and friends, and Mitchell was the first president and led the group for 25 years. Members and guests have included Edward Borein, Thomas M. Storke, Clark Gable, Ronald Reagan, and Walt Disney.

In 1938, Los Rancheros acquired the Covarrubias Adobe from historian and author John Southworth for $15,000, and they undertook reconstruction and strengthening of the house in 1940.

== See also ==
- Bohemian Club
- Bohemian Grove
- Cremation of Care
