= Thoughtcrime (disambiguation) =

Thoughtcrime is a word coined by George Orwell in his 1949 dystopian novel Nineteen Eighty-Four.

Thoughtcrime, thoughtcrimes, thought crime, or thought crimes may also refer to:

- Thoughtcrimes, 2003 film directed by Breck Eisner
- Thought Crimes: The Case of the Cannibal Cop, 2015 documentary film about Gilberto Valle
- Thoughtcrime, alias for Richard McCaslin
- thoughtcrimes, band formed by Billy Rymer
- Thoughtcrime, blog by Harold Covington
- Thoughtcrimes, book distributor founded by Leigh Blackmore

== See also ==
- The Thought Criminals (disambiguation)
