= Tea Krulos =

American writer (b. 1978)

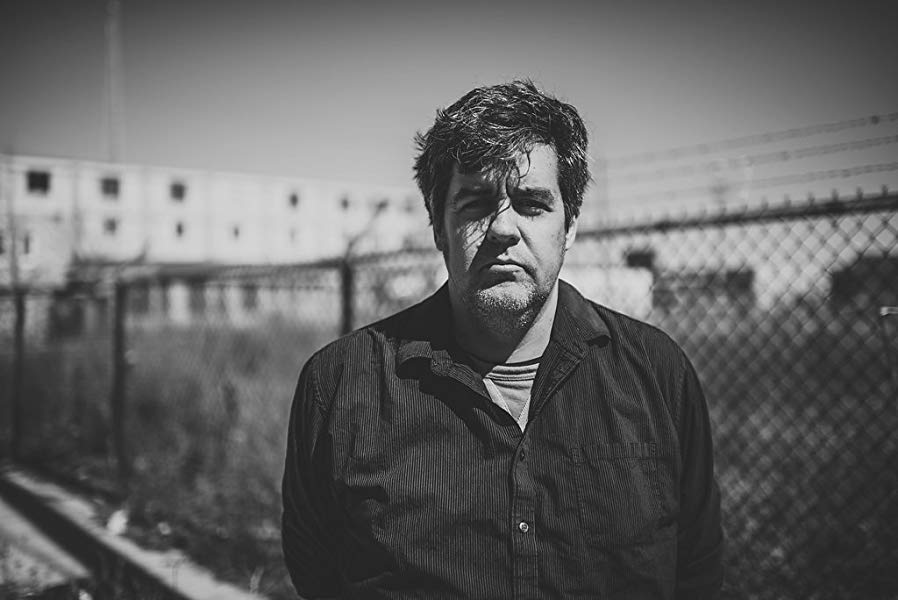
- Born: September 25, 1978 (age 47)
- Education: West Bend East High
- Occupations: Novelist, convention organizer

Tea Krulos (born September 25, 1978) is the pen name of an American author based in Milwaukee, WI. Krulos is known for writing several books, contributing to publications as a freelance journalist and a creator of sequential art pieces and zines.

== Literary works ==
Krulos is the author of four non-fiction works, and often travels during his research and embeds himself with his subjects in order to provide a neutral portrait of events that unfold. Krulos' work falls in the categories of non-fiction, social science, ethnography, and occasionally gonzo journalism.

Krulos' first book, Heroes in the Night: Inside the Real Life Superhero Movement (Chicago Review Press, 2013), involved shadowing self-proclaimed real-life superheroes. This project started when a real-life superhero began patrolling Krulos' native Milwaukee neighborhood Riverwest. Writing the book eventually took him across the country to cities like Seattle, Minneapolis, Detroit and New York. Notable figures interviewed include Richard McCaslin, known as "the Phantom Patriot," as well as Phoenix Jones. Krulos was shadowing Jones in Seattle for his book Heroes in the Night when they encountered what Jones claimed was a street brawl. Jones deployed pepper spray, leading to his subsequent arrest.

Krulos' second book, Monster Hunters: On the Trail with Ghost Hunters, Bigfooters, Ufologists, and Other Paranormal Investigators (Chicago Review Press, 2015), involved joining cryptozoologists on their various searches for the unknown. The book was nominated as a finalist in the 2015 Midwest Book Awards for the Social Science, Political Science, and Culture categories.

Krulos' third book, Apocalypse Any Day Now: Deep Underground with America’s Doomsday Preppers (Chicago Review Press, 2019), involves examining the lives of survivalists. In it, he meets with doomsday preppers, religious prognosticators and climate scientists. He follows a zombie-themed group of survivalists, tours the Survival Condos made out of former missile silos, and examines the going-ons at Wasteland Weekend. According to Skeptical Inquirer, the book's "tone is more breezy than scholarly" but "offers insight into the mentality of conspiracy theorists and doomsday prophets."

Krulos' fourth book, American Madness: The Story of the Phantom Patriot and How Conspiracy Theories Hijacked American Consciousness (Feral House, 2020), centers on the tragic figure Richard McCaslin. McCaslin adopted the real-life superhero persona "Phantom Patriot," a figure clad in a blue jumpsuit and skull mask. Believing Alex Jones' conspiracy theories about the Bohemian Grove involving child abuse and human sacrifice, McCaslin snuck into the private retreat campground and attempted it to burn it down on January 19, 2002.

In addition to his non-fiction work, Krulos wrote Palookaville, a collection of 21 poems and 8 illustrations created by the author.

== Sequential art ==
Krulos has assembled and produced several zine publications, including numerous editions of Riverwurst. an anthology comic featuring over two dozen artists. Krulos was also the founder and editor of the Riverwest Currents comic page, and co-editor of the Currents' offspring publication, "Undercurrents". His artwork has appeared in several gallery shows, and he has served as curator for other artists.

== Freelance journalism ==
Krulos is currently a freelance contributor to the altweekly publication the Shepherd Express and online magazine the Milwaukee Record. He also written for the British daily newspaper The Guardian.

== Personal life ==
Krulos currently lives in Milwaukee, Wisconsin. In his spare time, Krulos works as a bartender, conducts historic walking tours, and organizes the annual Milwaukee Paranormal Conference.
