= Statue of John J. Pershing (San Francisco) =

Statue by Haig Patigian in San Francisco, California, U.S.

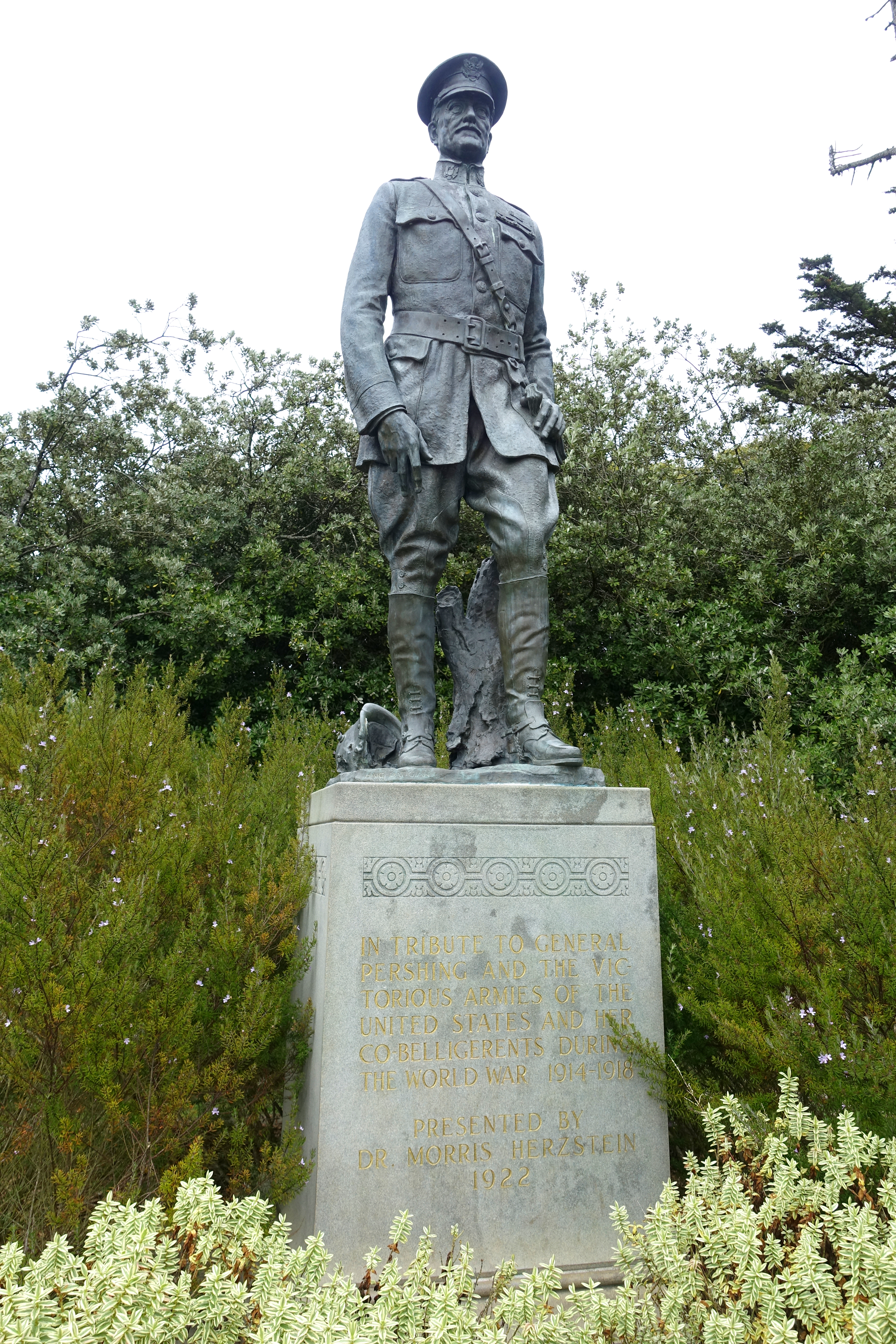
- The statue in 2015
- Artist: Haig Patigian
- Subject: John J. Pershing
- Location: Golden Gate Park; San Francisco; 37.77169°N 122.46604°W

A statue of John J. Pershing by Haig Patigian is installed in San Francisco's Golden Gate Park, in the U.S. state of California.
