= Statue of William McKinley (Canton, Ohio) =

Sculpture by Haig Patigian

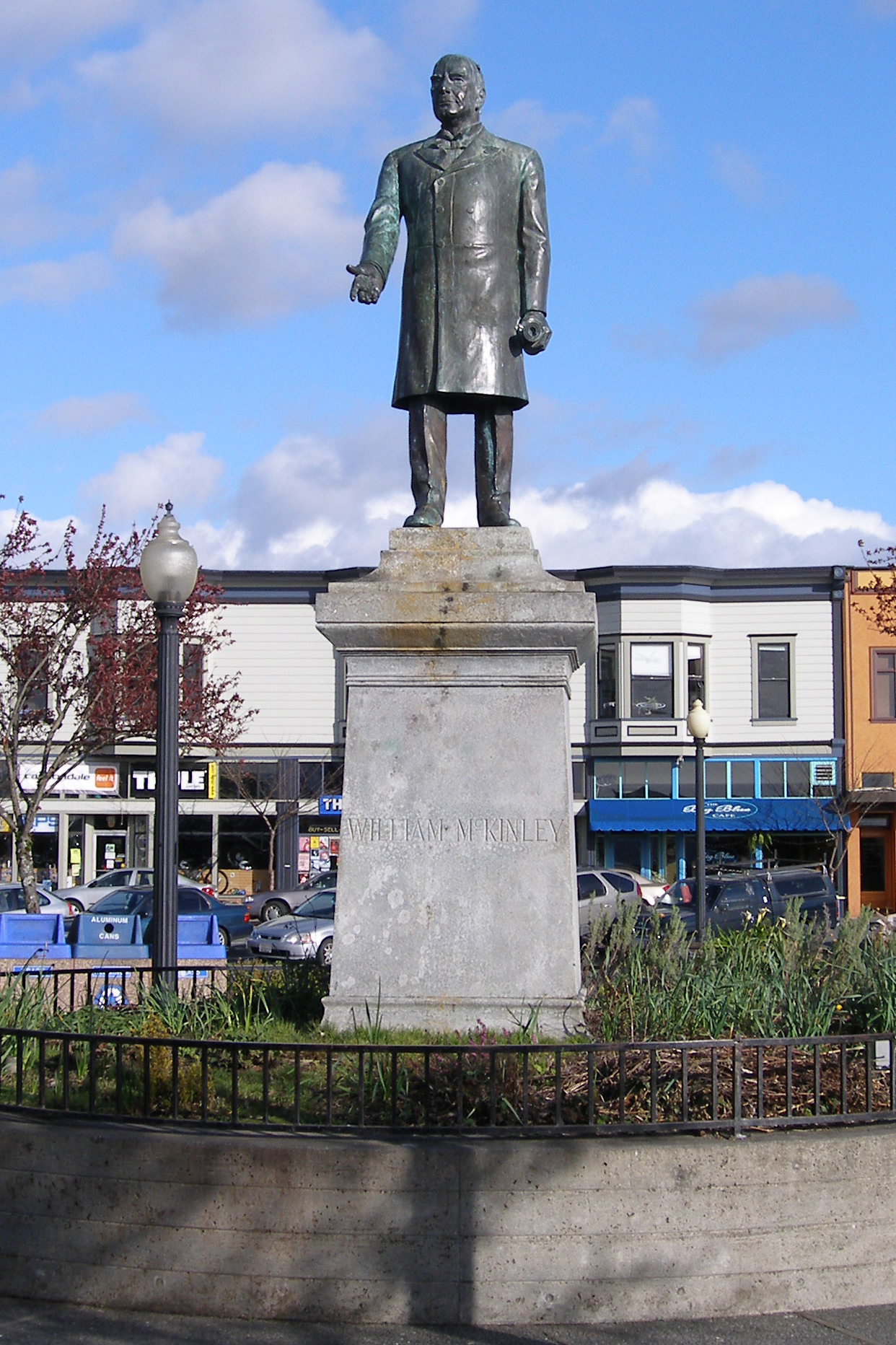
- The statue at its former location in Arcata
- Artist: Haig Patigian
- Year: 1906
- Subject: William McKinley
- Dimensions: 2.6 m (8.5 ft)
- Location: Canton, Ohio (formerly Arcata, California)

The Statue of William McKinley is a 8.5-foot (2.6 m) bronze statue of President of the United States William McKinley. The statue, sculpted by Haig Patigian, stood in the center of the town plaza in Arcata, California, from 1906 to 2019, when it was moved to Canton, Ohio.

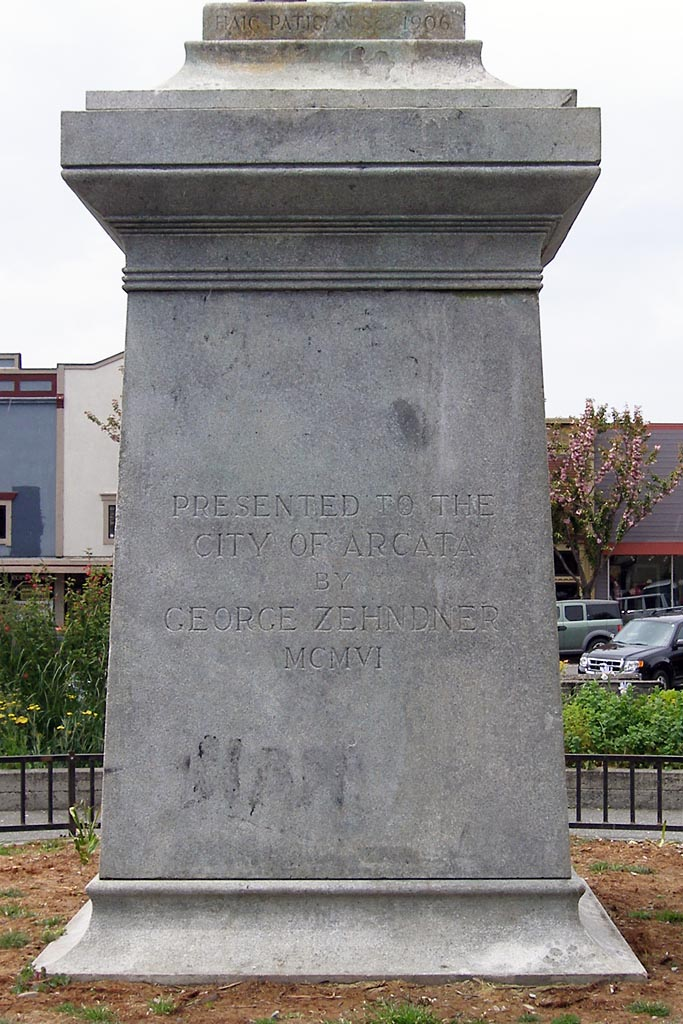
Inscriptions on the original pedestal of the McKinley statue. At top is inscribed the sculptor's name, and below, the statue's dedication.

This statue of McKinley was commissioned by 81-year-old 49'er George Zehndner in 1905. Zehndner had met McKinley in 1901 and was much impressed by "the first modern president". The president's assassination soon after moved Zehndner to memorialize the president. Zehndner paid $15,000 for the nine-foot statue. The statue was sculpted by Haig Patigian in San Francisco, California, where it fell over during the 1906 San Francisco earthquake but was cushioned by a large plaster model that had braced its fall. The artist discovered his statue lying down in a foundry near the waterfront south of Market Street in San Francisco. Patigian feared his statue might melt, but he had to leave it since it was too large for him to move. A week later, the foundry owner told Patigian that the statue had been destroyed.

Patigian later discovered that his statue of McKinley had been saved from the burning foundry by the employee of a nearby machine shop, along with several passersby. They had hauled the statue onto a truck, which succumbed to the flames. The statue was moved by steamboat to the nearby port town of Eureka in May 1906. Zehndner presented the statue to the city of Arcata on July 4, 1906, as "a gift to the city of Arcata for all time to come." Two thousand people, more visitors than the town had ever received, came to Arcata for the unveiling.

The statue, formerly located in the middle of the Arcata Plaza, was in the center of the town's cultural activity. The statue had been embroiled in controversy in Arcata, a liberal college town in Humboldt County, California, since the 1970s. Opponents of the statue decried McKinley's allegedly racist and imperialistic policies, while defenders supported the statue's historical importance and characterized removal attempts as censorship. On February 21, 2018, the Arcata City Council voted to remove the statue from the plaza. Councilmembers who cast their vote in favor of removal were Paul Pitino (motion), Susan Ornelas (second), Arcata Vice Mayor Brett Watson and Mayor Sofia Pereira. Following this controversy a public referendum was held and the people of Arcata voted on whether to keep the statue. The people voted against the measure and ensured that the statue be moved and replaced. Community members of Arcata fought for the removal of the statue, citing McKinley's annexing of tribal lands in the western U.S. and Hawaii, and the racist ties that the former president maintained while in office. A demand was set for a new marker, replacing a plaque referring to a “time of Indian troubles,” to remind residents of Arcata about the area's Indigenous residents and the pre-colonial history of the area.

In February 2019, the Arcata City Council approved a measure to relocate the statue to Canton, Ohio, and on February 28, the statue was removed from the Plaza in preparation for its relocation. A nearby plaque on the plaza containing what many considered racially insensitive language regarding local native history was also removed in 2018.

In July 2022, it was announced that the Stark County, Ohio courthouse would be the location of the statue, with a local foundation donating the costs of statue restoration and placement. The Timken Foundation purchased the statue for $15,000 and transported it to Ohio where it was restored. It was then moved to Louisville to have a new metal base installed, and was unveiled to the public in Canton October 21, 2023. Ohio governor Mike DeWine and political advisor and McKinley historian Karl Rove gave speeches, and carnations were distributed to the crowd.

== See also ==
- List of sculptures of presidents of the United States
- Monument and memorial controversies in the United States
