= Belizean Grove =

American women's social club

Belizean Grove logo

The Belizean Grove is an invitation-only American women's social club, located in New York City. The club was founded in 2001 by Susan Stautberg, a former Westinghouse Broadcasting executive, and author and futurist Edie Weiner.

Modeled after the San Francisco-based Bohemian Club, Belizean Grove formed to duplicate for women how the "old boy's network supported one another", stated co-founder Stautberg, the membership of which was known to bond at annual retreats held at Bohemian Grove in California.

The Belizean Grove meets annually in Belize or similar Central American locations. They also meet in New York and other U.S. cities, for activities they describe as "a balance of fun, substantive programs and bonding".

Members, known as "grovers", numbered 125 in 2009, including military, financial and diplomatic leaders, and 390 in 2015. Members have included former General Services Administration Administrator Lurita Doan and U.S. Army General Ann E. Dunwoody. C-suite executives from Goldman Sachs, Victoria's Secret, and Harley-Davidson also belong to the Grove, as do some ambassadors. Other business leaders include Mary C. Pearl and Christine Toretti.

Supreme Court Justice Sonia Sotomayor is a former member of Belizean Grove. She resigned membership June 19, 2009, after Republican senators voiced concerns over the group's women-only membership policy.

== See also ==
- Gentlemen's club
- Women's club
