= Cremation of Care =

Annual ritual production by and for members of the Bohemian Club

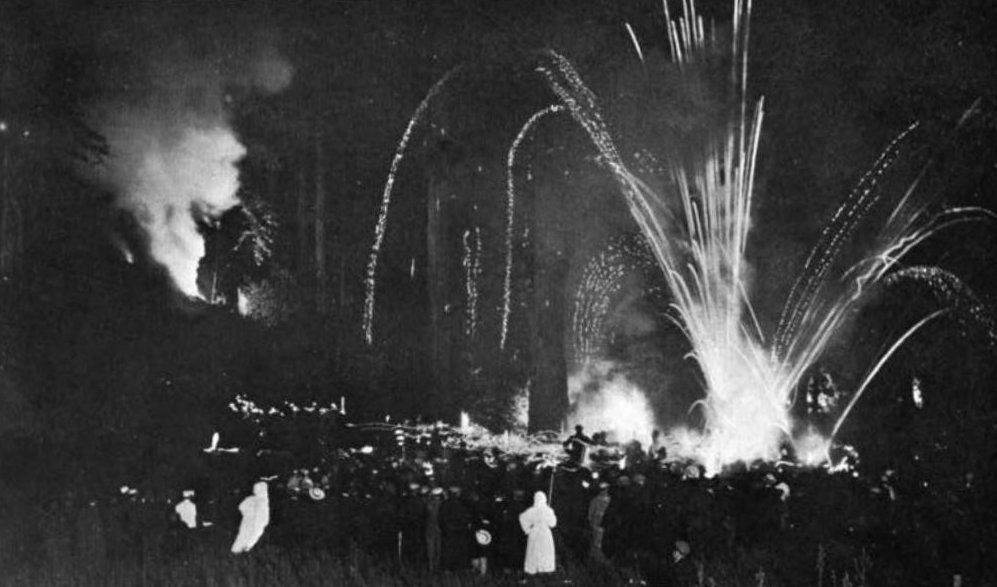
The pyrotechnic climax to the 1907 Cremation of Care

The Cremation of Care is an annual ritual production written, produced, and performed by and for members of the Bohemian Club. It is staged at the Bohemian Grove near Monte Rio, California, in front of a 40-foot-tall (12-meter) image of an owl, at a small artificial lake amid a private old-growth grove of Redwood trees.

The dramatic performance is presented on the first night of the annual encampment as an allegorical banishing of worldly cares for the club members and "to present symbolically the salvation of the trees by the club", but the secretive nature of the Bohemians and the political power of some of its members have been criticized.

== History ==
″In accordance with [a recommendation from Albert Gerberding and others who remain nameless], the Club for the first time held its solemn Midsummer festival under the wide-spreading branches that overshadow the pure and limpid waters of Austin Creek, the price of tickets being five dollars, to be paid for on delivery, each member providing his own blankets and the Club munificently providing straw, on which the members reposed in Spartan simplicity.″ – Anonymous Member, The Annals of the Bohemian Club · Volume 3, pp. 12-13.

In 1878, the Bohemian Club of San Francisco first took to the woods in Taylorville, California (present-day Samuel P. Taylor State Park) for a summer celebration that they called Midsummer High Jinks. Poems were recited, songs were sung, and dramatic readings were given; the practice was repeated each summer in other areas, primarily near the Russian River in Sonoma County. In 1881, the ceremony of the Cremation of Care was first conducted after the various individual performances, with James F. Bowman as Sire. The ceremony was further expanded in 1893 by a member named Joseph D. Redding, with a Midsummer High Jinks entitled The Sacrifice in the Forest, or simply "Druid Jinks", in which brotherly love and Christianity battled and won against paganism, converting the druids away from bloody sacrifice. Redding formed the framework of the ceremony but the main actors, including George Tisdale Bromley as High Priest, were asked to supply their own major speeches. In 1904, the prologue to William Henry Irwin's Grove Play The Hamadryads included text such as "Touch their world-blind eyes with fairy unguents." The play depicted the intrusion, the battles, and the symbolic death of the maleficent Spirit of Care.

In the earliest productions of the Grove Play, several restrictions were imposed upon the Sire (host, chief planner, and master of ceremonies) including that the stage setting be the natural forest backdrop and that the "malign character Care" be introduced in the plot, to wreak havoc with the characters and then be faced down and vanquished by the hero. In these early productions, the Cremation of Care immediately followed, and lasted until midnight. The end of the ceremony was signaled by a lively Jinks Band rendition of There'll Be a Hot Time in the Old Town Tonight, and the club members sat down to a late dinner and revelry.

From 1913, the Cremation of Care was disengaged from the Grove Play, and rescheduled for the first night of the summer encampment. The Grove Play was set for the final weekend. A different Sire was appointed for the Cremation, and some concerns were raised in subsequent years that the Cremation of Care was growing into its own secondary Grove Play. Some Sires experimented with a satirical treatment, or topical themes such as a patriotic World War I treatment in 1918 and an unpopular Prohibition script in 1919. "Care" was not killed, let alone cremated, in the 1922 version. In response to member complaints about the unpredictable quality of the opening night fare, Charles K. Field was asked in 1923 to standardize the script for what became the basis for every subsequent Cremation of Care ceremony.

== Staging ==
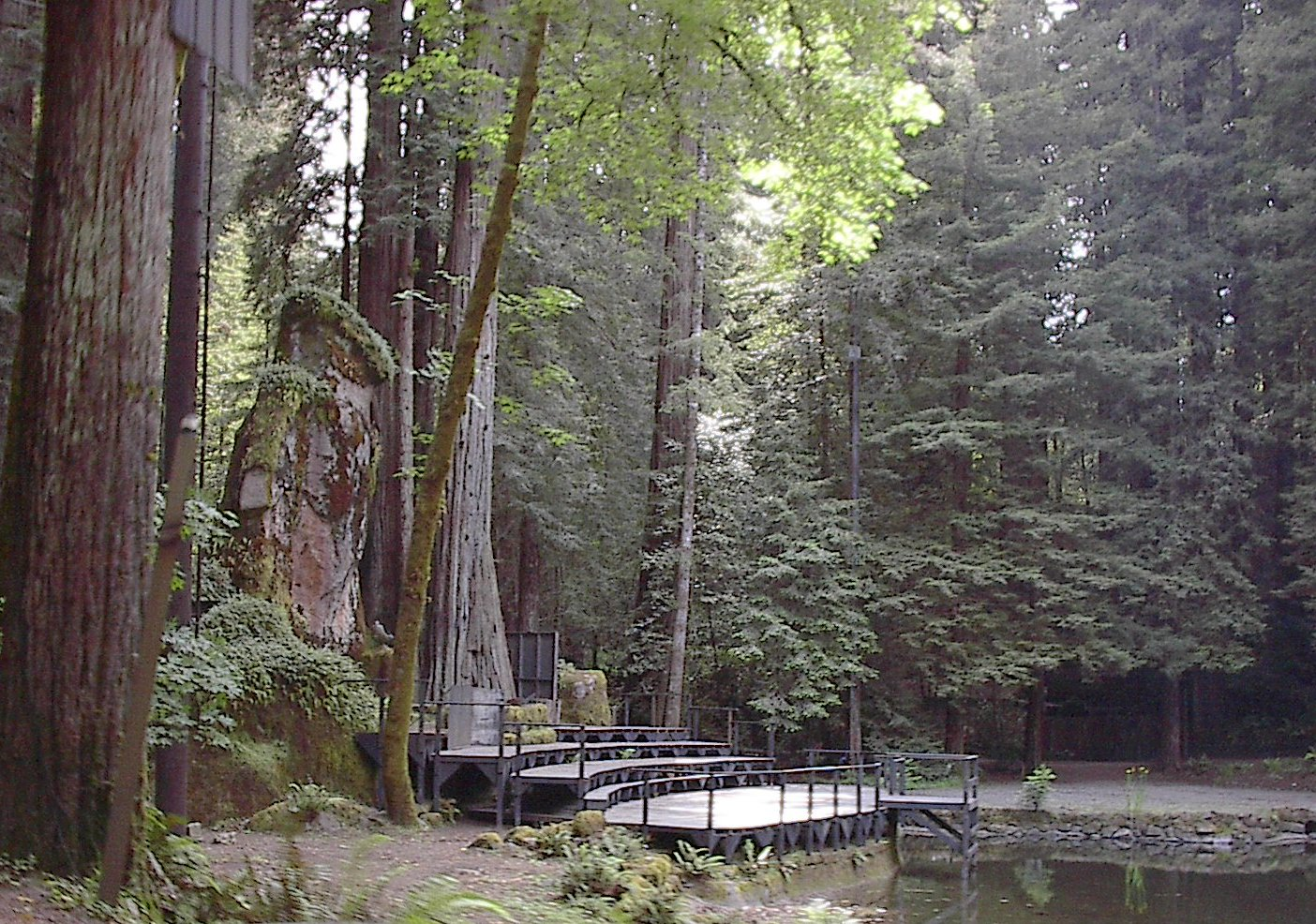
The Owl Shrine covered in moss, standing among trees behind a stage at one edge of a man-made pond.

The ceremony involves the poling across a lake of a small boat containing an effigy of Care (called "Dull Care"). Dark, hooded figures receive from the ferryman the effigy, which is placed on an altar, and, at the end of the ceremony, set on fire. This "cremation" symbolizes that members are banishing the "dull cares" of conscience. At the time the script was developed, the primary meaning of the word 'care' (< O.E. cearu, "anxiety, anguish") was synonymous with 'worry', having more negative connotations than in modern times when it tends to be associated more positively with compassion.

The ceremony takes place in front of the Owl Shrine, a 40-foot (12 m) hollow owl statue made of concrete over steel supports. The moss- and lichen-covered statue simulates a natural rock formation, yet holds electrical and audio equipment within it. During the ceremony, a recording is used as the voice of The Owl. For many years the recorded voice was club guest Walter Cronkite. Music and pyrotechnics accompany the ritual for dramatic effect.

== Controversy ==
Radio host Alex Jones, alongside cameraman Mike Hanson, infiltrated the Bohemian Grove on July 15, 2000, and filmed the Cremation of Care ceremony with a hidden camera. The footage became central to the Jones documentary Dark Secrets: Inside Bohemian Grove. Jones claimed that the Cremation of Care was an "ancient Canaanite, Luciferian, Babylon mystery religion ceremony". Jon Ronson covered Jones and the Grove as part of the documentary series The Secret Rulers of the World. Writing in Them: Adventures with Extremists (2001), Ronson offered his view of the Cremation of Care ritual: "My lasting impression was of an all-pervading sense of immaturity: the Elvis impersonators, the pseudo-pagan spooky rituals, the heavy drinking. These people might have reached the apex of their professions but emotionally they seemed trapped in their college years."

== Protests ==
Protesters outside the main entrance of the Bohemian Grove have held a "Resurrection of Care" ceremony, intended to symbolically reverse the effects of the Cremation of Care, to prevent the attendees from temporarily abandoning their cares. The protest event was first organized in 1980 by Mary Moore, a former beauty queen turned left-wing activist. Moore was less concerned about countering the Cremation of Care ceremony than with the likelihood that club members (and guests) with corporate interests would gain government influence.
