= Covarrubias Adobe =

California Historical Landmark

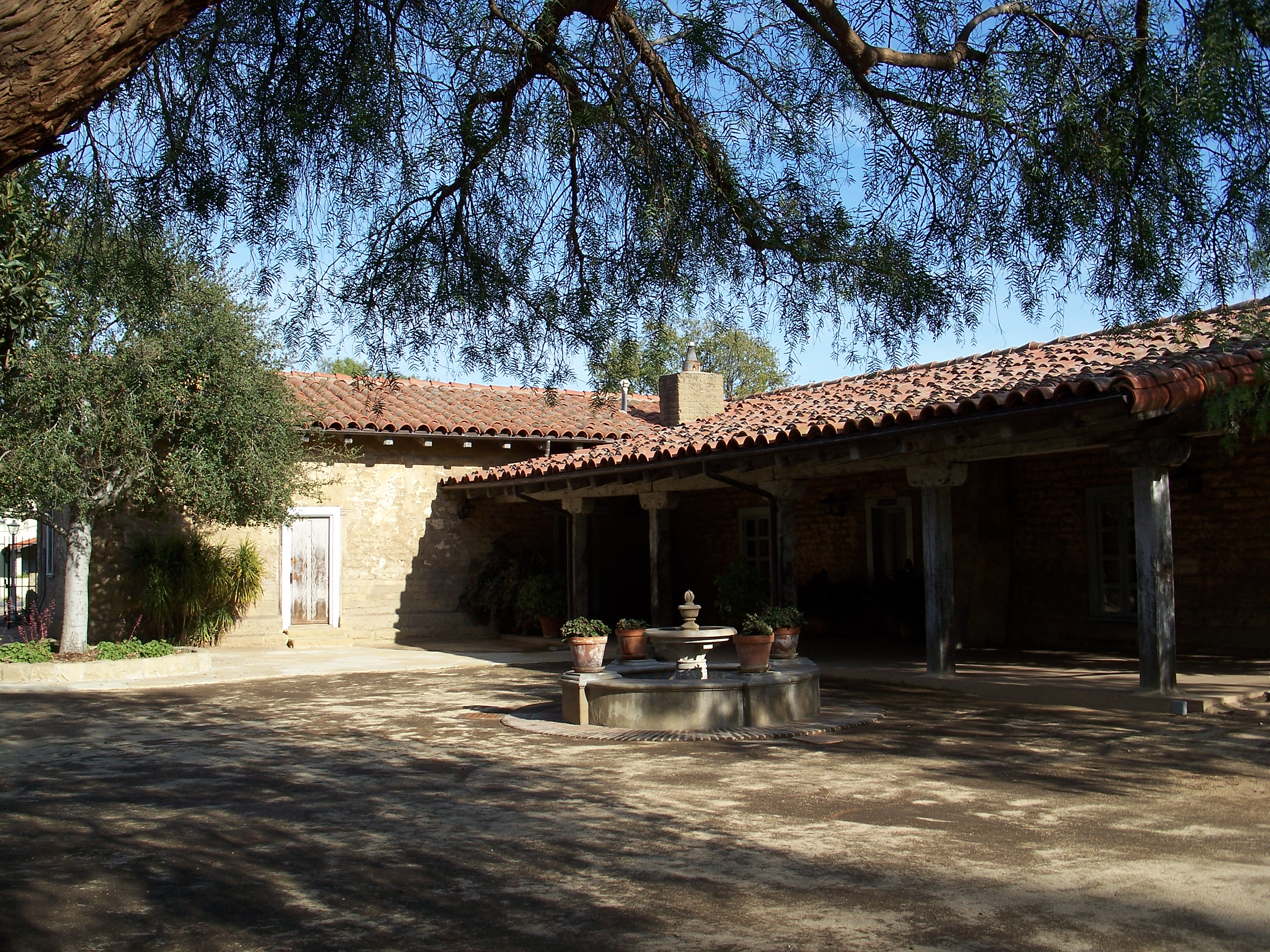
- Covarrubias Adobe
- Interactive map of Covarrubias Adobe
- 34°25′15″N 119°41′45″W
- Location: Santa Barbara, Santa Barbara County, California

California Historical Landmark
- Official name: Covarrubias Adobe
- Designated: September 12, 1939
- Reference no.: 308

The Covarrubias adobe is a California Historical Landmark in Santa Barbara, California. The house is one of the oldest in Santa Barbara, built in 1817. The adobe became a California State Historical Landmark No. 308 on September 12, 1939. The house is also on the Santa Barbara City Landmark. The house is located at 715 Santa Barbara Street. The house is L-shaped with four rooms. The original Spanish tile roof was later replaced.

== History ==
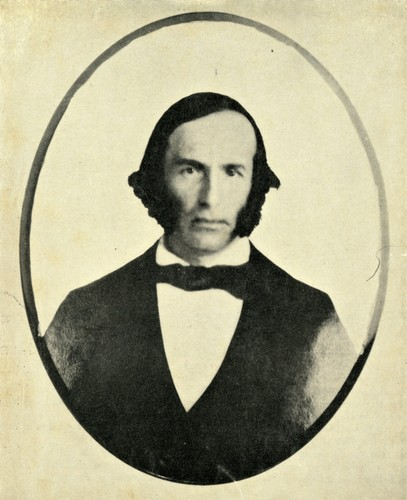
José M. Covarrubias, the Californio politician who owned the Covarrubias Adobe.

Don Domingo Carrillo used local Chumash Indians labor to build the house. He built the house for his wife Concepción Pico Carrillo (Jan. 09, 1797 -?). Concepción and Domingo married on October 14, 1810, Concepción is the sister of Pío Pico, the last governor of Alta California. In the 1830s Domingo Carrillo was a leader of the Santa Barbara Presidio. The presidio was built by Spain in 1782, to defend the Spanish missions in California in New Spain. The adobe-house is named after a later occupant José María Covarrubias, who married Carrillo's daughter María in 1834. After Carrillo death in March 1837, his wife continued to live in the adobe until her death. José María Covarrubias was from France and came to California in 1834. Covarrubias became Pío Pico private secretary in 1845. In 1849 Covarrubias was a delegate to the California Constitutional Convention. From 1849 to 1862 Covarrubias was a member of the California State Assembly, then served as a Judge.

The Covarrubias families owned and lived in the home till 1910. The home was sold a few times, in 1920 the house was sold to John Southworth. Southworth was a historian and author of history books on Los Angeles, San Diego, Baja California and Santa Barbara.

In 1920 Southworth completed overdue repairs. Southworth also purchased another historic adobe built in 1825 and moved it near the Covarrubias adobe. Too old to be a house, Southworth turned the house into an antique shop. In 1936 he leased both houses to restaurant-nightclub. In 1938 he sold the house to Los Rancheros Visitadores, a riding club for $15,000. The club did reconstruction and strengthening of the house in 1940. Ownership and use changed and many times, In World War II, it was the British War Relief Society, then a Chamber of Commerce, then the office for the Santa Barbara National Horse and Flower Show.

In 1964, the Santa Barbara Historical Society purchased the Covarrubias and adjacent Historic adobe in 1964. Part of the house is the office of the Society's Docent Council. The adobe also used for community activities.

- California State Historical Landmark reads:

NO. 308 COVARRUBIAS ADOBE - The adobe was built by Indian labor in 1817 for Don Domingo Carrillo. In 1838, his daughter married Don José María Covarrubias, who in 1852 became the first federal elector from California. Descendants of these families, many of them leaders in public affairs, occupied this house for over a century. John R. Southworth moved and rebuilt the 'Historic Adobe' here in 1924 as part of a civic program of historic preservation. Los Adobes de los Rancheros acquired the property in 1938 as headquarters for Los Rancheros Visitadores and for the use and enjoyment of the people.

== See also ==
- Military districts in Spanish California
- History of Santa Barbara, California
- California Historical Landmarks in Santa Barbara County, California
