= Haig Patigian =

Armenian American sculptor (1876–1950)

- Հայկ Բադիկեան; Hayg Patigian
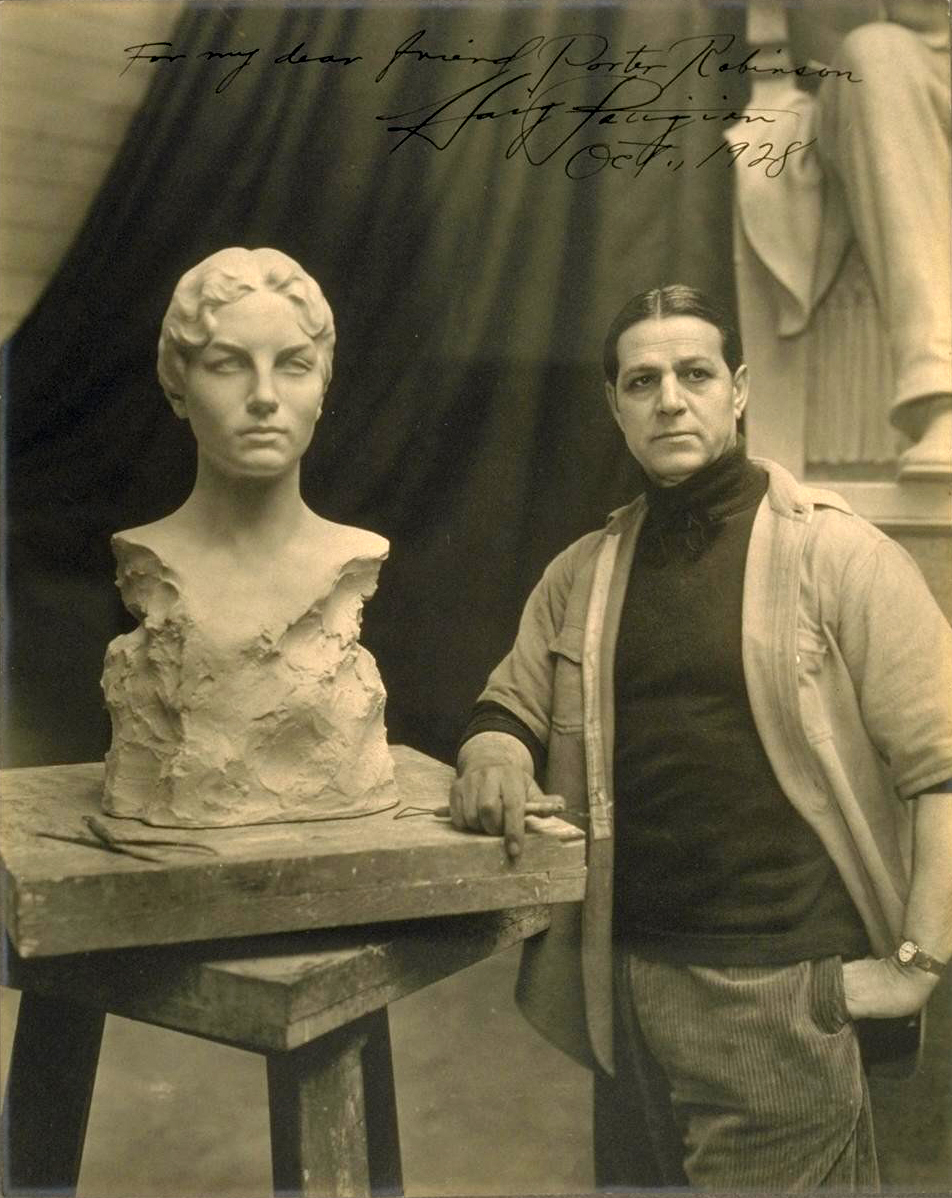
- Haig Patigian standing next to his bust of Helen Wills Moody, 1928
- Born: January 22, 1876; Van, Ottoman Empire (now Turkey)
- Died: September 19, 1950 (aged 74)
- Occupation: Sculptor
- Spouse: Blanche Hollister (m. 1908–1950; her death)

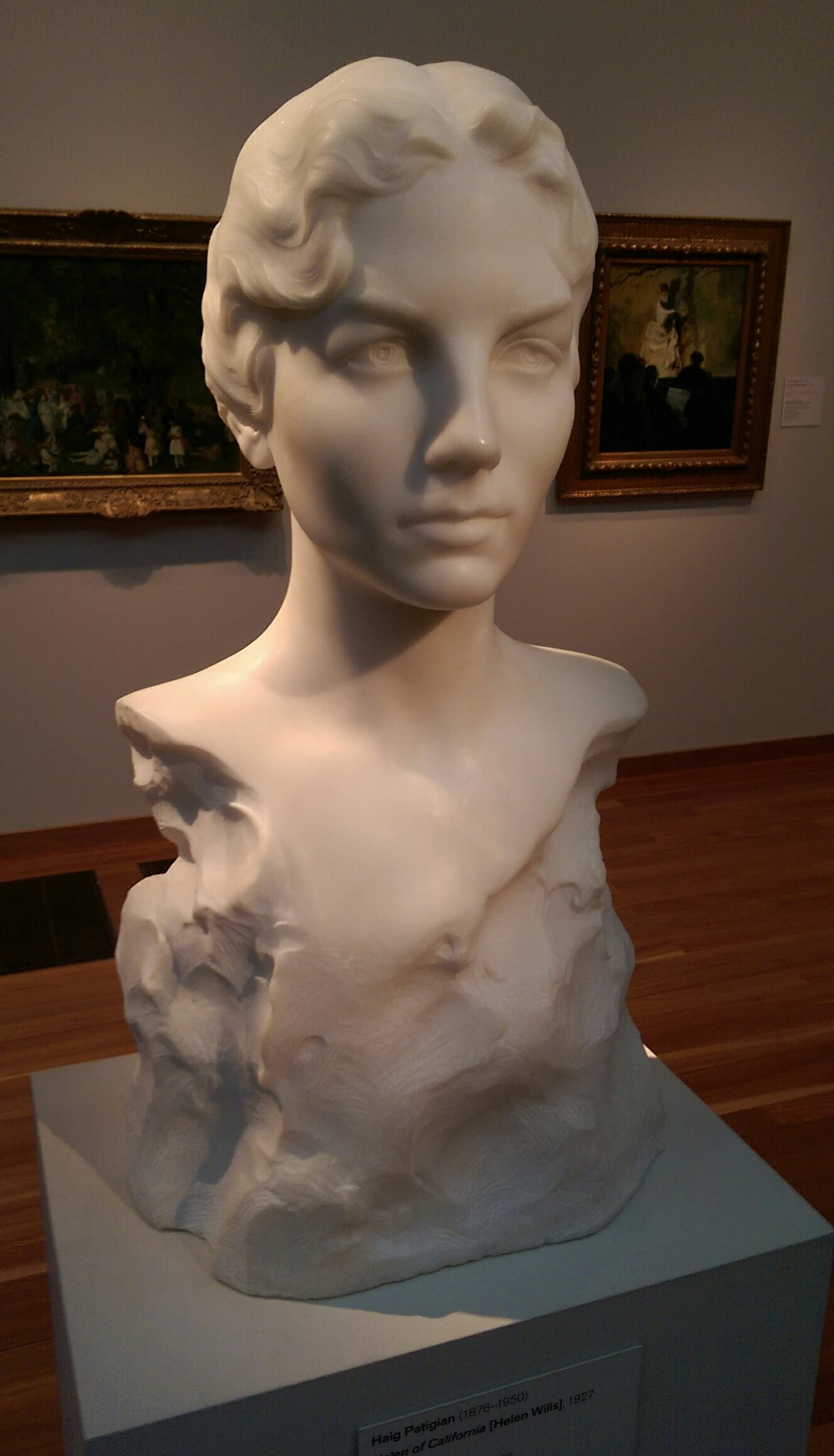
Helen of California by Haig Patigian, on display at the de Young Museum in San Francisco

Haig Patigian (Armenian: Հայկ Բադիկեան; January 22, 1876 – September 19, 1950), was an Ottoman Empire-born American sculptor, of Armenian heritage. He spent most of his life in San Francisco, California.

== Biography ==
Haig Patigian was born on January 22, 1876, in Van, Ottoman Empire (now Turkey), to parents of Armenian heritage. His father Avedis was a photographer, and he was accused by the Turkish government of acts of espionage and religious treason, resulting in the family needing to flee. Around 1891, Avedis left first, and settled in Fresno, California. A year or so later the rest of the family joined him. Around 1899, the Patigian family moved to San Francisco, California.

He was largely self-taught as a sculptor. Patigian spent most of his career in San Francisco, and most of his works are located in California. The Oakland Museum of California in Oakland, California, includes a large number of his works in its collection, and more can be seen in and around San Francisco City Hall.

Patigian was an active member of the Bohemian Club, serving two terms as club president. He designed the Owl Shrine, a 40-foot high hollow concrete and steel structure which was built in the 1920s to have the appearance of a natural rock outcropping which happened to resemble an owl. The Owl Shrine became the centerpiece of the Cremation of Care ceremony at the Bohemian Grove in 1929.

Patigian married Blanche Hollister of Courtland, California, in 1908. They lived in a house in at the corner of Hyde and Francisco Streets in the Russian Hill neighborhood. Blanche died on September 10, 1950, only nine days before her husband.

Patigian died at age 74 on September 19, 1950, at Stanford University Hospital in San Francisco, California. He is buried at Cypress Lawn Memorial Park in Colma, California.

== Public works ==
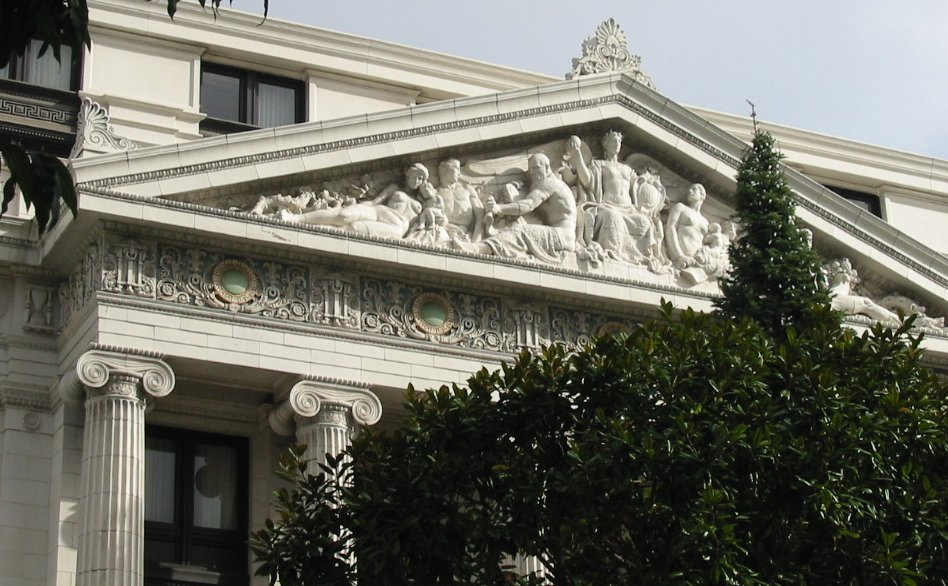
Entrance of 600 Stockton, San Francisco, the former Metropolitan Life building, now a Ritz-Carlton hotel. Visible behind a decorated Christmas tree are the Ionic columns surmounted by a pediment containing a tableau created in 1920 by Patigian for his client Timothy L. Pflueger of Miller and Pflueger, architects

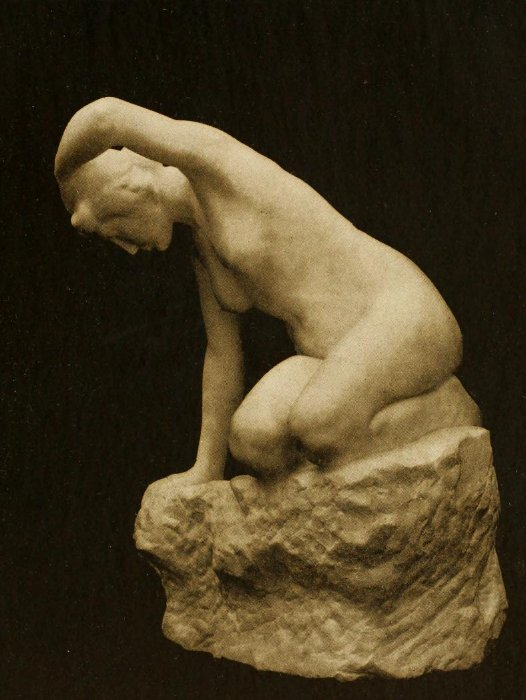
Vanity, shown in 1916 at the Palace of Fine Arts

- McKinley statue (1906), Arcata, California (removed February 28, 2019 and moved to Canton, Ohio)
- B.D. Murphy relief plaque (1912), Sunnyvale, California
- Monument to Dr. Chester Rowell (1914), Fresno, California
- Electricity, Imagination, Invention and Steam (c. 1915); four repeated sculptures at the Machinery Palace, Panama-Pacific International Exposition, San Francisco, California (destroyed)
- Statue of Gen. John Pershing (1922), San Francisco, California
- Statue of Abraham Lincoln (1926), San Francisco, California
- Statue of Thomas Starr King (1931), Sacramento, California; this work resided in the Capitol Building in Washington, D.C. as one of California's contributions to the National Statuary Hall Collection until being replaced by a statue of Ronald Reagan in 2009.
- Bronze death mask of George Sterling (1926), library of the Bohemian Club, San Francisco. A second copy is in the Henry Meade Williams Local History Room of the Harrison Memorial Library, Carmel-by-the-Sea, California.
- Volunteer Firemen Memorial (1933), San Francisco, California

== Architectural sculpture ==
- M. H. de Young Memorial Museum, tympanum, San Francisco, California, circa 1895 (removed)
- San Francisco Savings Union Bank building, pediment, San Francisco, California, 1911
- Palace of Fine Art & the Machinery Palace, (now destroyed) Panama-Pacific Exposition, San Francisco, California, 1915
- Metropolitan Life Insurance Building, (now the Ritz Carlton Hotel) pediment, San Francisco, California, 1920
- Navigation, Aviation, and Industry, Richfield Tower, Los Angeles, California, allegorical figures, 1928. When the building was demolished in 1968, the figures were moved to the University Art Museum of the University of California, Santa Barbara. Three of the figures are on public display on campus.
- Department of Commerce Building, pediment, Washington D.C., 1934
