= Jules Eugene Pages =

American painter

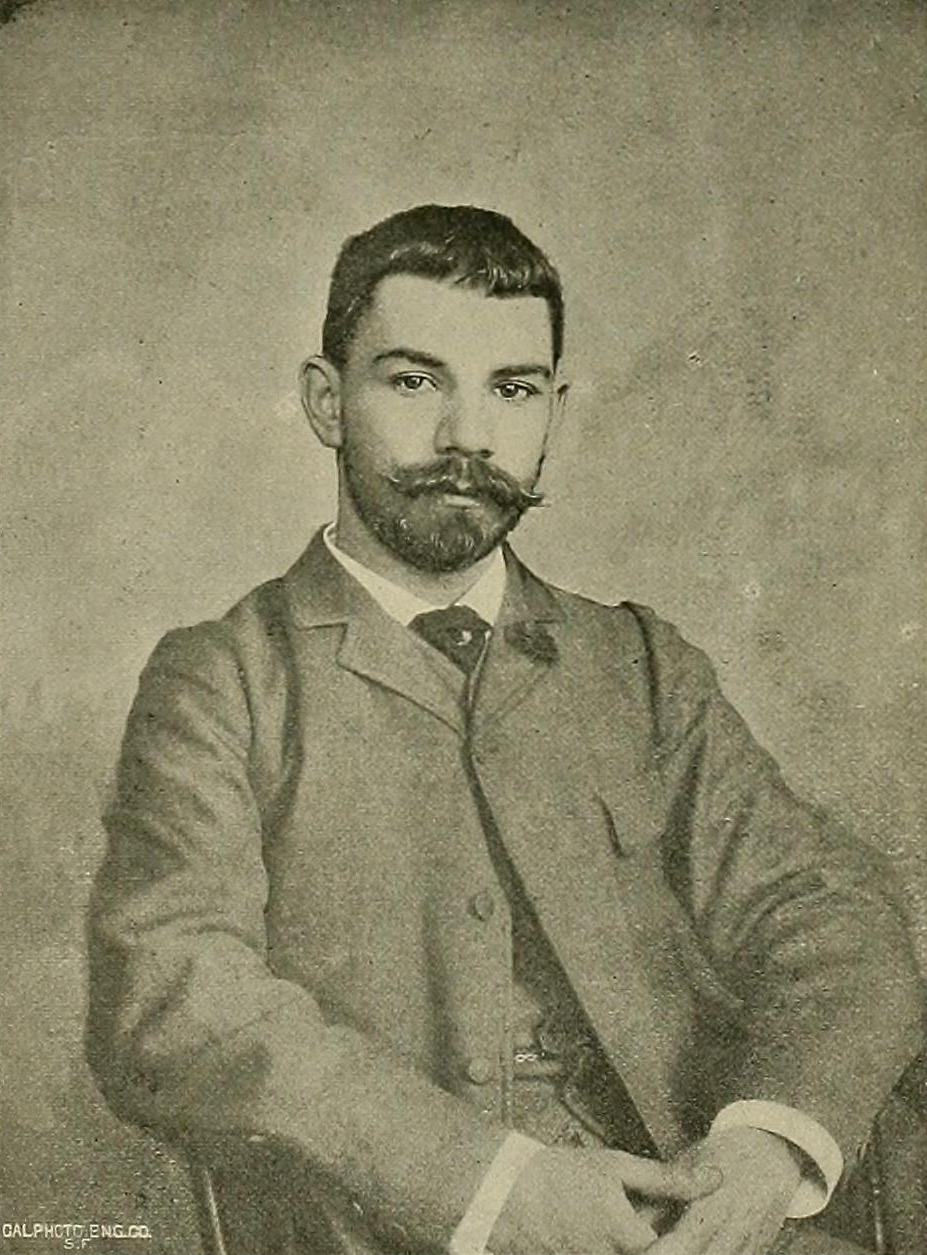
- Pages c. 1895
- Born: May 16, 1867; San Francisco, California, U.S.
- Died: May 22, 1946 (aged 79); San Francisco, California, U.S.
- Other names: Jules Pages, Jules Eugène Pages, Jules Eugène Pagès
- Known for: Landscape and marine paintings
- Movement: Impressionism

Jules Eugene Pages (1867-1946), sometimes Jules Eugène Pagès, was an American painter. He is known for landscape, marine and genre paintings in the impressionist manner.

== Biography ==
Born in San Francisco, California on May 16, 1867, to parents with French ancestry. He was raised in an artistic environment. His father, Jules Françios Pages (1843-1910) ran a local engraving business, and his son worked there as an apprentice. In 1888, he moved to Paris, France in order to study at the Académie Julian under Jules Joseph Lefebvre, Jean-Joseph Benjamin-Constant and Tony Robert-Fleury.

After returning to San Francisco, he worked as an illustrator for The San Francisco Examiner, and other newspapers. He returned to Paris, in 1902 and began teaching night classes at the Académie Julian. Pages spent forty years in France, returning frequently to San Francisco to paint and exhibit his work. He exhibited his work in 1915 at the Panama-Pacific International Exposition (PPIE).

Following the outbreak of World War II, Pages returned to the United States and died in San Francisco on May 22, 1946.

== Collections ==
- San Francisco's De Young (museum)
- Musée d'Orsay
- Bohemian Club of San Francisco

== Gallery ==
Works by Jules Pages

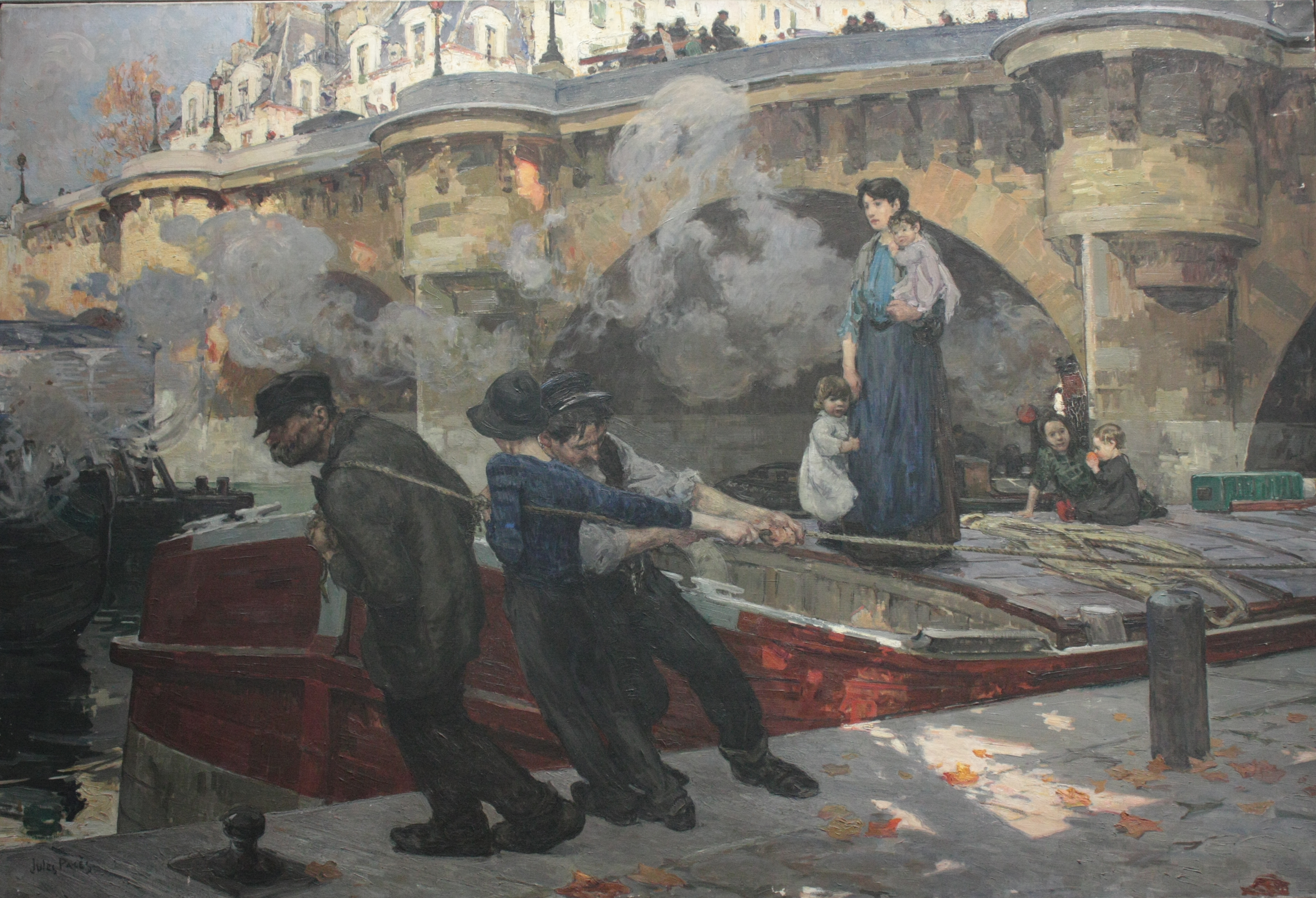
Mariniers au Pont Neuf à Paris, 1910, Musée des beaux-arts de Pau, France

== Bibliography ==
Bohemian Club, 1946 :Jules Pages took his leave the other day ...
