= José M. Covarrubias =

Californio politician (1809–1870)

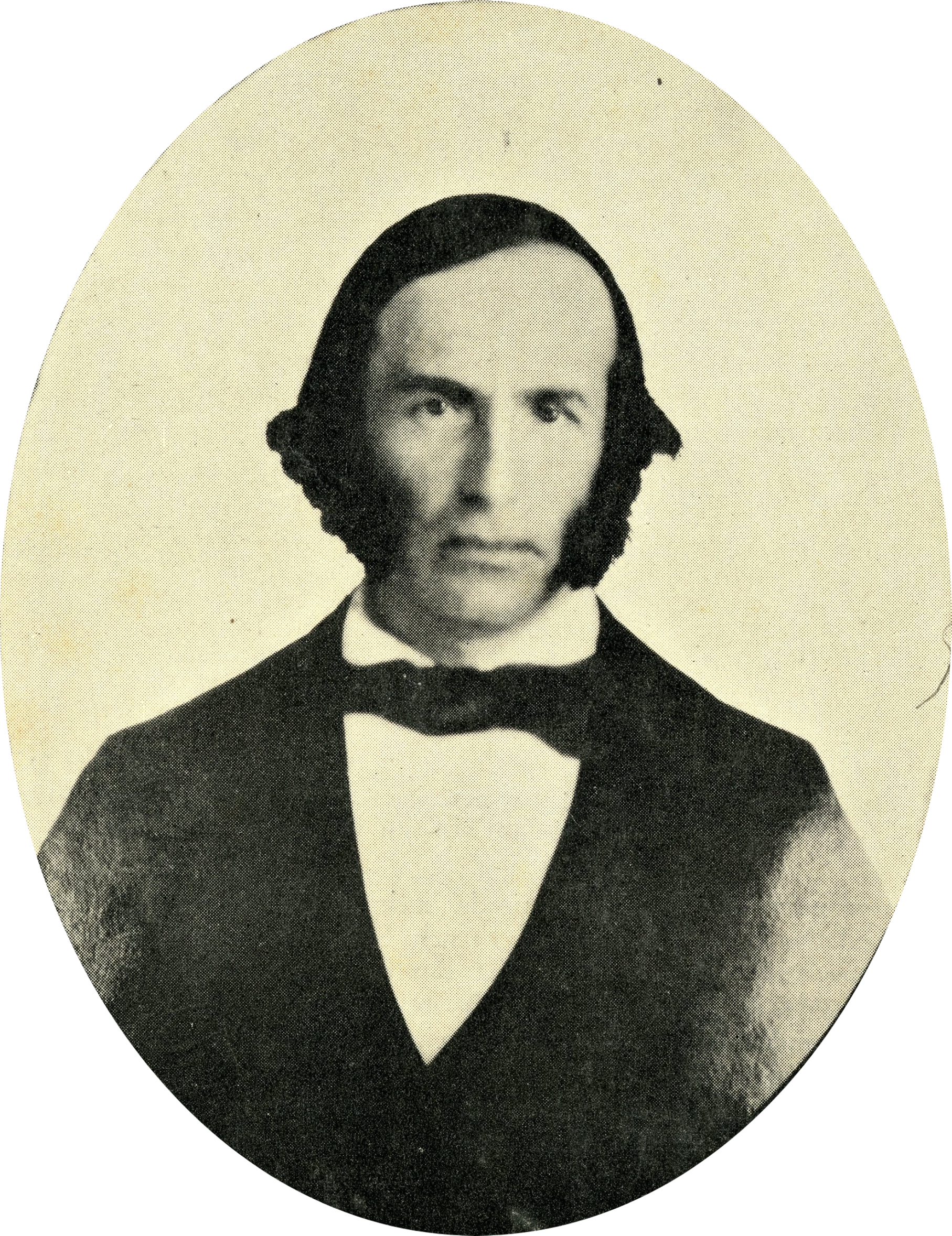

Mayor of Santa Barbara
- In office 1853–1854
- Preceded by: Isaac J. Sparks
- Succeeded by: Joaquín de la Guerra

Member of the California State Assembly
- In office January 2, 1860 – January 6, 1862
- Constituency: 2nd district
- In office January 1, 1855 – January 5, 1857
- Constituency: 2nd district
- In office January 3, 1853 – January 2, 1854
- Constituency: 3rd district
- In office January 6, 1851 – November 6, 1852
- Constituency: 3rd district
- In office December 17, 1849 – April 26, 1850
- Constituency: Santa Barbara district

Personal details
- Born: c. 1809 France
- Died: April 1, 1870 (aged 60–61) Santa Barbara, California
- Party: Democratic
- Spouse: Maria del Espiritu Santo Dominga Carrillo (m. 1838)
- Children: 8

José María Covarrubias (c. 1809 – April 1, 1870) was a Californio politician and a signer of the Californian Constitution in 1849. He served as mayor of Santa Barbara from 1853 to 1854, and represented the city in the California State Assembly for several terms between 1849 and 1862.

== Life ==
Covarrubias born to a Spanish family from France that emigrated to Mexico in 1818. He came to California in 1834. Covarrubias became Pío Pico's private secretary in 1845.

He married Domingo Carrillo's daughter María in 1834. They lived in Covarrubias Adobe a California Historical Landmark in Santa Barbara, California.

In the 1830s Domingo Carrillo was a leader of the Presidio of Santa Barbara and married to Concepción Pico Carrillo (Jan. 09, 1797 -?). Concepción and Domingo married on October 14, 1810, Concepción is the sister of Pío Pico, the last governor of Alta California.

He served as the delegate for San Luis Obispo to the California Constitutional Convention of 1849 and was a signer of the Californian Constitution.
