= Bohemian Club =

Private gentlemen's club in California, United States

Coordinates: 37.78814°N 122.41160°W

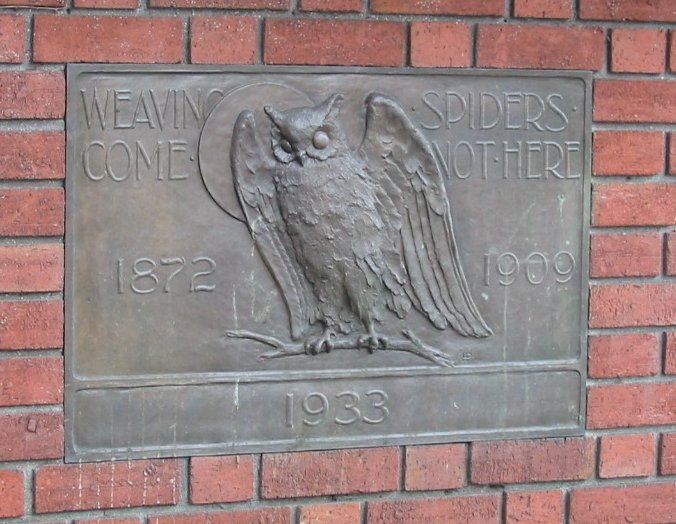
- Metal bas relief owl and inscription on the brick wall at 624 Taylor Street, San Francisco
- Formation: 1872; 154 years ago
- Type: Private Men's Social Club IRC 501(c)7
- Purpose: Arts, politics, business
- Headquarters: 624 Taylor Street, San Francisco, California
- Website: www.bohemianclub.com

The Bohemian Club is a private club with two locations: a city clubhouse in the Nob Hill district of San Francisco, California, and the Bohemian Grove, a retreat north of the city in Sonoma County. Founded in 1872 from a regular meeting of journalists, artists, and musicians, it soon began to accept businessmen and entrepreneurs as permanent members, as well as offering temporary membership to university presidents (notably Berkeley and Stanford) and military commanders who were serving in the San Francisco Bay Area. Today, the club has a membership of many local and global leaders, including artists, musicians, businessmen, and politicians. Membership remains restricted to men only.

== Clubhouse ==
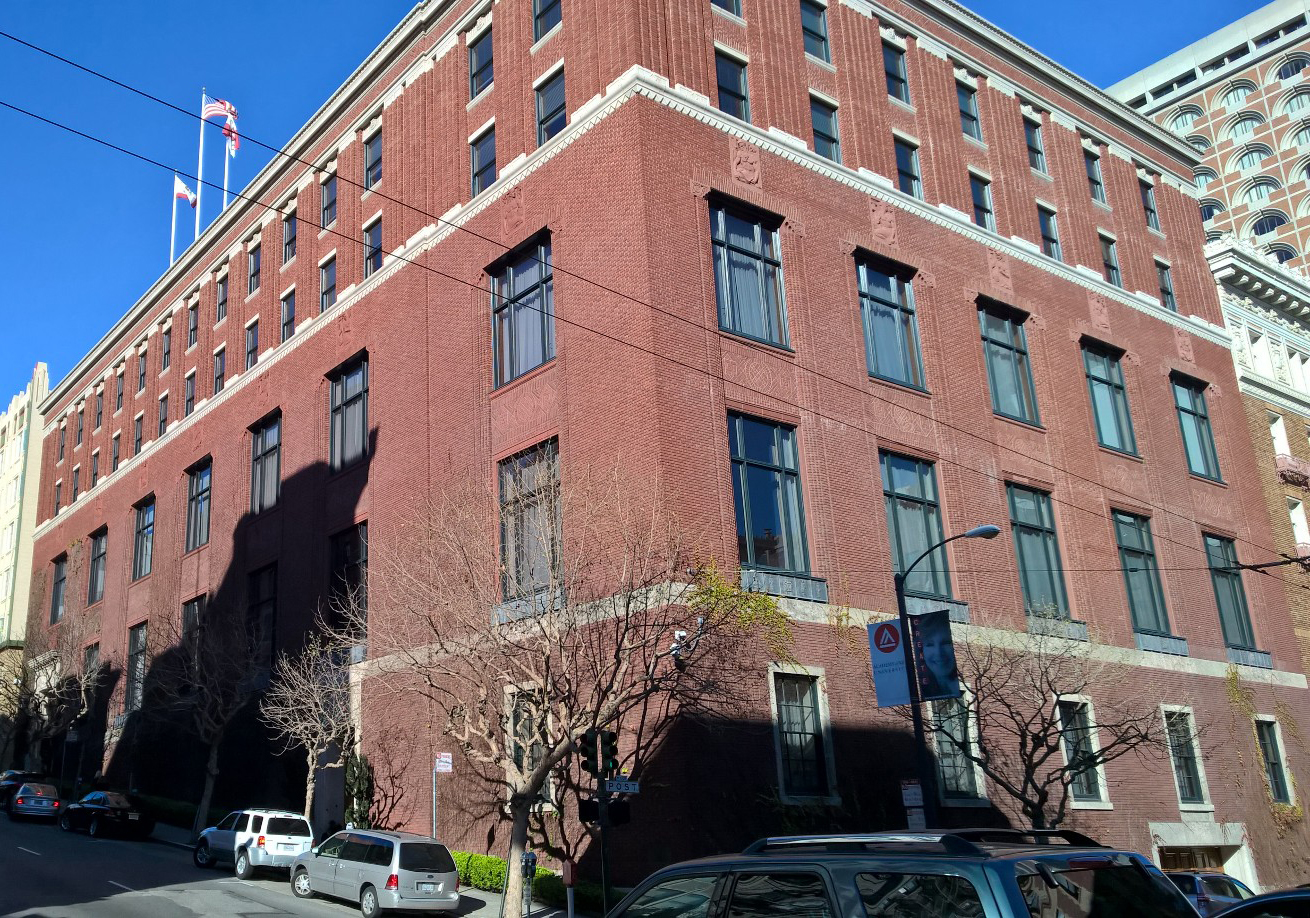
The Bohemian Club's City Clubhouse, from the corner of Taylor Street and Post Street

The City Club is located in a six-story masonry building at the corner of Post Street and Taylor Street, two blocks west of Union Square, and on the same block as both the Olympic Club and the Marines Memorial Club. The clubhouse contains dining rooms, meeting rooms, a bar, a library, an art gallery, a theater, and guest rooms.

=== Bohemian Grove ===
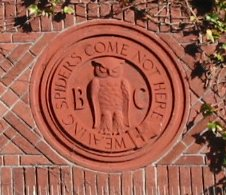
The club's mascot owl cast in masonry perched over the main entrance at 624 Taylor Street. The owl is flanked by the letters B and C and surrounded by words of the club's motto.

Every year, the club hosts a two-week-long (three weekends) camp at Bohemian Grove, which is notable for its guest list and its eclectic Cremation of Care ceremony which mockingly burns an effigy of "Care" (the normal woes of life) with grand pageantry, pyrotechnics, and brilliant costumes, all done at the edge of a lake and at the base of a forty-foot "stone" owl statue (actually made of concrete). In addition to that ceremony, devised by co-founder James F. Bowman in 1881, there are also two outdoor performances (dramatic and comedic plays), often with elaborate set design and orchestral accompaniment. The more elaborate of the two is the Grove Play, or High Jinks; the more ribald is called Low Jinks. The productions are often original creations of the Associate members, but active participation of hundreds of members of all backgrounds is traditional.

=== Nathanial Brittan Party House ===
Nathaniel J. Brittan co-founded the Bohemian Club of San Francisco in 1872 and by 1892 was the president of the club. He built the Nathanial Brittan Party House in San Carlos, California, in order to entertain his friends from the club and to use as a hunting lodge.

== History ==
=== Bohemianism ===
In New York City and other American metropolises in the late 1850s, groups of young, cultured journalists flourished as self-described "bohemians", until the American Civil War broke them up and sent them out as war correspondents. During the war, reporters began to assume the title "bohemian", and newspapermen in general took up the moniker. "Bohemian" became synonymous with "newspaper writer". California journalist Bret Harte first wrote as "The Bohemian" in The Golden Era in 1861, with this persona taking part in many satirical doings. Harte described San Francisco as a sort of Bohemia of the West. Mark Twain called himself and poet Charles Warren Stoddard bohemians in 1867.

=== Founding ===
The Bohemian Club was originally formed in April 1872 by and for journalists who wished to promote a fraternal connection among men who enjoyed the arts. Michael Henry de Young, proprietor of the San Francisco Chronicle, provided this description of its formation in a 1915 interview:

The Bohemian Club was organized in the Chronicle office by Tommy Newcombe, Sutherland, Dan O'Connell, Harry Dam, J.Limon and others who were members of the staff. The boys wanted a place where they could get together after work, and they took a room on Sacramento street below Kearny. That was the start of the Bohemian Club, and it was not an unmixed blessing for the Chronicle because the boys would go there sometimes when they should have reported at the office. Very often when Dan O'Connell sat down to a good dinner there he would forget that he had a pocketful of notes for an important story.

Journalists were to be regular members; artists and musicians were to be honorary members. The group quickly relaxed its rules for membership to permit some people to join who had little artistic talent, but enjoyed the arts and had greater financial resources. Eventually, the original "bohemian" members were in the minority and the wealthy and powerful controlled the club. Club members who were established and successful, respectable family men, defined for themselves their own form of bohemianism, which included men who were bon vivants, sometime outdoorsmen, and appreciators of the arts. Club member and poet George Sterling responded to this redefinition:

Any good mixer of convivial habits considers he has a right to be called a Bohemian. But that is not a valid claim. There are two elements, at least, that are essential to Bohemianism. The first is devotion or addiction to one or more of the Seven Arts; the other is poverty. Other factors suggest themselves: for instance, I like to think of my Bohemians as young, as radical in their outlook on art and life; as unconventional, and, though this is debatable, as dwellers in a city large enough to have the somewhat cruel atmosphere of all great cities.

Despite his purist views, Sterling associated very closely with the Bohemian Club and caroused with artist and industrialist alike at the Bohemian Grove.

Oscar Wilde, upon visiting the club in 1882, is reported to have said, "I never saw so many well-dressed, well-fed, business-looking Bohemians in my life."

=== Membership ===
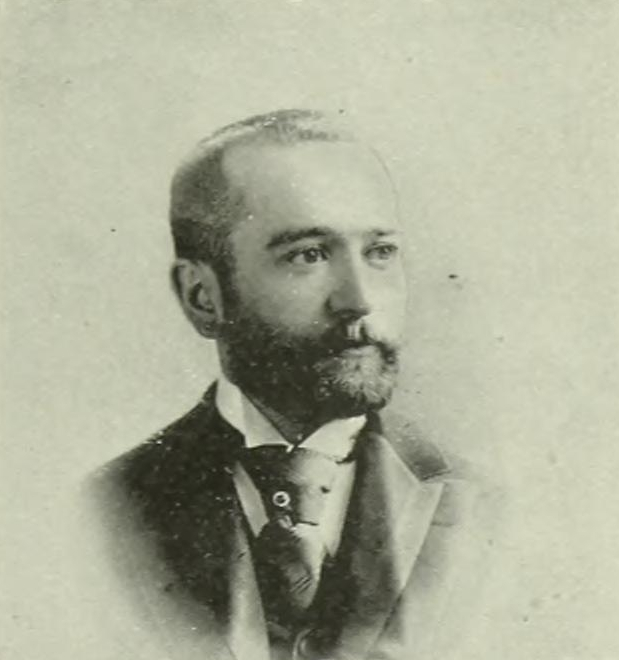
Future San Francisco mayor James D. Phelan as club president, 1891

A number of past membership lists are in the public domain, but modern club membership lists are private. Some prominent figures have been given honorary membership, such as Richard Nixon and William Randolph Hearst. Members have included some U.S. presidents (usually before they are elected to office), many cabinet officials, and CEOs of large corporations, including major financial institutions. Major military contractors, oil companies, banks (including the Federal Reserve), utilities, and national media have high-ranking officials as club members or guests. Many members are, or have been, on the board of directors of several of these corporations; however, artists and lovers of art are among the most active members. The club's bylaws require ten percent of the membership be accomplished artists of all types (composers, musicians, singers, actors, lighting artists, painters, authors, etc.). During the first half of the 20th century, membership in the club was especially valued by painters and sculptors, who exhibited their work on the premises, in both permanent displays and special exhibitions, and did not pay any commissions on sales to members. Many of the club's artists were nationally recognized figures, such as William Keith, Arthur Frank Mathews, Xavier Martinez, Jules Eugene Pages, Edwin Deakin, William Ritschel, Jo Mora, Maynard Dixon, and Arthur Putnam.

The club motto is "Weaving Spiders Come Not Here", a line taken from Act 2, Scene 2, of Shakespeare's A Midsummer Night's Dream. The club motto implies that outside concerns and business deals are to be left outside. When gathered in groups, Bohemians usually adhere to the injunction, though discussion of business often occurs between pairs of members. They once put on a production of Macbeth, with Colin Powell as the lead.

Despite this motto, business was still talked about in the Bohemian Club. According to a memo from Edwin Harper, one of Ronald Reagan's assistants, to Alan Greenspan, Reagan's 1983 cuts to social security were planned at a Bohemian Club meeting two years prior in 1981. There are also reports from a book that a Reagan advisor was persuaded to cut capital gains taxes by venture capitalist Bill Draper while they "sat semi-naked at the grove." Bill Draper and his son, Tim Draper, are both on the 2023 attendance list (see below), still attending the bohemian club 42 years later. Many other backstage political figures were, and still are, a part the Bohemian Club, including Pete Coors. Along with being a member of the Coors beer family empire, he co-founded the Heritage Foundation, an American conservative think tank that was heavily involved with the Reagan Administration.

== Present day ==
The Bohemian Club retains its influence to this day, with numerous artists, businessmen, and executives actively participating in the Bohemian Club. Alex Jones and Jon Ronson famously infiltrated the Bohemian Grove in 2000, with Jones reporting about it to his growing number of followers. According to Jones, he witnessed a human sacrifice while at the Bohemian Club, but Ronson has since stated that the human sacrifice never happened, that it was simply a burning log/effigy, and that Jones knowingly lied to his audience. This led to a heavily armed fan of Jones to attempt to break into Bohemian Grove and kill everyone there because of his belief that they were committing human sacrifice. Supreme Court Justice Clarence Thomas famously accepted gifts in the late 2010s from Harlan Crow that included a trip to Bohemian Grove. Edwin Feulner, co-founder of the Heritage Foundation, was on the attendance list in 2023.

One of the most closely tied families to the Bohemian Club is the Bechtel family. There is a famous picture of Stephen Bechtel Sr. with Henry Kissinger at the Bohemian Club in 1999. The Bechtel family owns Bechtel, a massive construction firm. It is likely due to their deep ties to Bohemian Club members, including George W. Bush and Colin Powell, that Bechtel was awarded the first major contract to rebuild Iraq. David McCormick, who was elected to the senate for Pennsylvania in 2024, is a member of the Bohemian Club, with at least 11 members of the Bohemian Club donating to his campaign. Once in office, he backed massive AI data center investment in Pennsylvania, where Bechtel will receive billions in construction contracts through this investment. Bechtel has billions of investments tied up in Venezuelan oil, and has also been floated as a potential leader for rebuilding Gaza, further tangling the Bechtel company and the United States governmental activity.

Paul Pelosi, Nancy Pelosi's husband, is on the Bohemian Club list, as well as their nephew, Laurence Pelosi, who works for Harlan Crow. In addition, an estimated quarter of the architects of Project 2025 were a part of the Bohemian Club, including Edwin Feulner.

Donald Trump has reportedly been denied access to join the Bohemian Club and has never been a member.

== Bret Harte Memorial ==
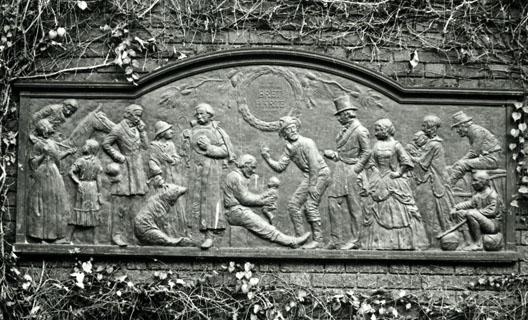
The Bret Harte Memorial by Jo Mora

A bronze relief by Jo Mora is installed on the exterior of the building. It serves as a memorial to author and poet Bret Harte. The relief, which is 3 ft 3 7/8 in (101.3 cm) by 7 ft 11 5/8 in (242.9 cm) by 2 1/2 in (6.4 cm), was first dedicated on August 15, 1919, as a tribute by Mora, who was a member, to fellow Bohemian Club member Harte. The relief shows fifteen characters from books by Harte. It is inscribed:

Proper left, upper corner:

J J MORA AUGUST 15, 1919

Proper left, lower edge:

L. DE ROME BRONZE FOUNDRY

Top center wreath:

IN MEMORIAM BRET HARTE 1836–1902 AD

followed by the founder's mark for L. De Rome. When the original building was torn down, the relief was removed. In 1934, it was reinstalled on the building that stands today.

== See also ==
- Belizean Grove – Women's club in New York City modeled after the Bohemian Club
- List of Bohemian Club members
- Bilderberg Meeting
- The Family (club)
- Trilateral Commission
- Rancheros visitadores
- List of gentlemen's clubs in the United States
- Membership discrimination in California clubs

== Bibliography ==
- Domhoff, G. William. Bohemian Grove and Other Retreats: A Study in Ruling-Class Cohesiveness, Harper & Row, 1975. ISBN 0-06-131880-9
- Dulfer & Hoag. Our Society Blue Book, San Francisco, Dulfer & Hoag, 1925.
- Garnett, Porter, The Bohemian Jinks: A Treatise, 1908
- Ogden, Dunbar H.; Douglas McDermott; Robert Károly Sarlós (1990). Theatre West: Image and Impact. Rodopi. ISBN 90-5183-125-0.
- Parry, Albert. (2005.) Garretts & Pretenders: A History of Bohemianism in America, Cosimo, Inc. ISBN 1-59605-090-X
- Watson, E. H. "The Bohemian Club Legacy." The English review 62.3 (1936): 289–306.

=== Primary sources ===
- Bohemian Club. Constitution, By-laws, and Rules, Officers, Committees, and Members, 1904
- Bohemian Club. Semi-centennial high jinks in the Grove, July 28, 1922. Haig Patigian, Sire.
- Bohemian Club. History, officers and committees, incorporation, constitution, by-laws and rules, former officers, members, in memoriam, 1960
- Bohemian Club. History, officers and committees, incorporation, constitution, by-laws and rules, former officers, members, in memoriam, 1962
- Memorandum, Edwin L. Harper to Alan Greenspan, August 4, 1981. Memorandum. ID #093802, WE007, WHORM: Subject File, Ronald Reagan Library

Archival sources

- Finding Aid to the Bohemian Club Collection 1872-2009 (bulk 1890-1970) at the San Francisco Public Library, Book Arts and Special Collections Center
- Finding Aid to Bohemian Grove Photographs, 1890 to 1950, at San Francisco Public Library, San Francisco History Center
- Finding Aid to Digitized Textual Material in the Reagan Library Archives
