= Bohemian Grove =

Private men's club in California, United States

Coordinates: 38°28′05″N 123°00′10″W

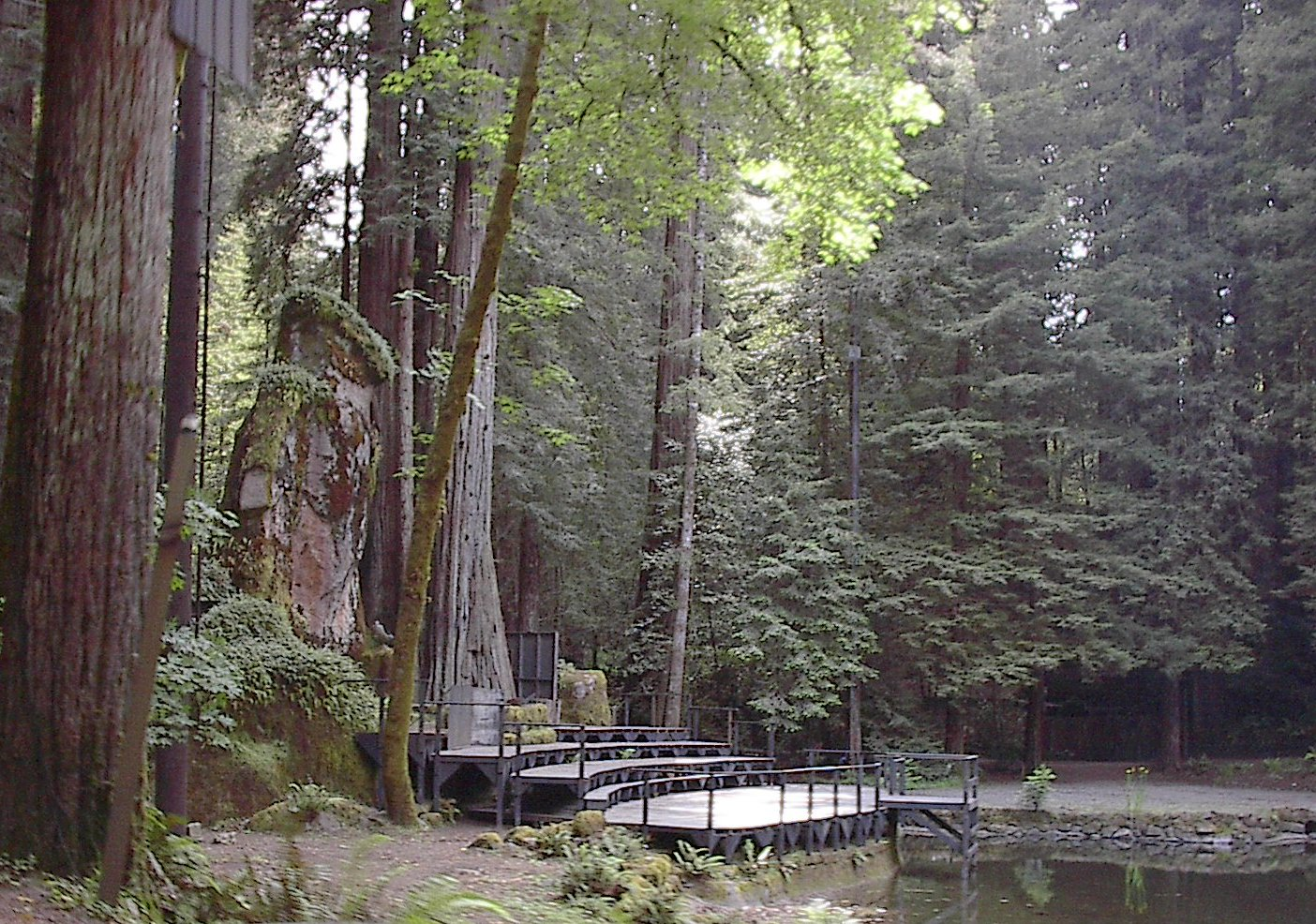
- The Owl Shrine covered in moss, standing among trees behind a stage at one edge of a man-made pond, Bohemian Grove
- Interactive map of Bohemian Grove
- Location: 20601 Bohemian Avenue; Monte Rio, California, United States
- Elevation: 991 feet (302 m)
- Land: 2,700 acres (1,100 ha)
- Annual attendance: about 2,500
- Operated by: Bohemian Club
- Established: 1878

The Bohemian Grove is a private campground covering 2,700 acres (1,100 ha) in Monte Rio, California. Founded in 1878, it is owned by a private gentlemen's club called the Bohemian Club. Each year in mid-July, the Bohemian Grove hosts an annual gathering lasting more than two weeks, attended by invited members and guests from politics, business, and the arts.

== History ==
The tradition of a summer encampment began in 1878, six years after the Bohemian Club was founded in 1872. That year, founding member and stage actor Henry "Harry" Edwards announced that he was moving to New York City to further his career. On June 29, 1878, fewer than 100 Bohemians gathered in the redwoods of Marin County near Taylorville (present-day Samuel P. Taylor State Park) for an evening send-off held in his honor. The gathering included food, drink, and lanterns, and participants stayed overnight at the site. The event was repeated the following year without Edwards and developed into the club's annual encampment.

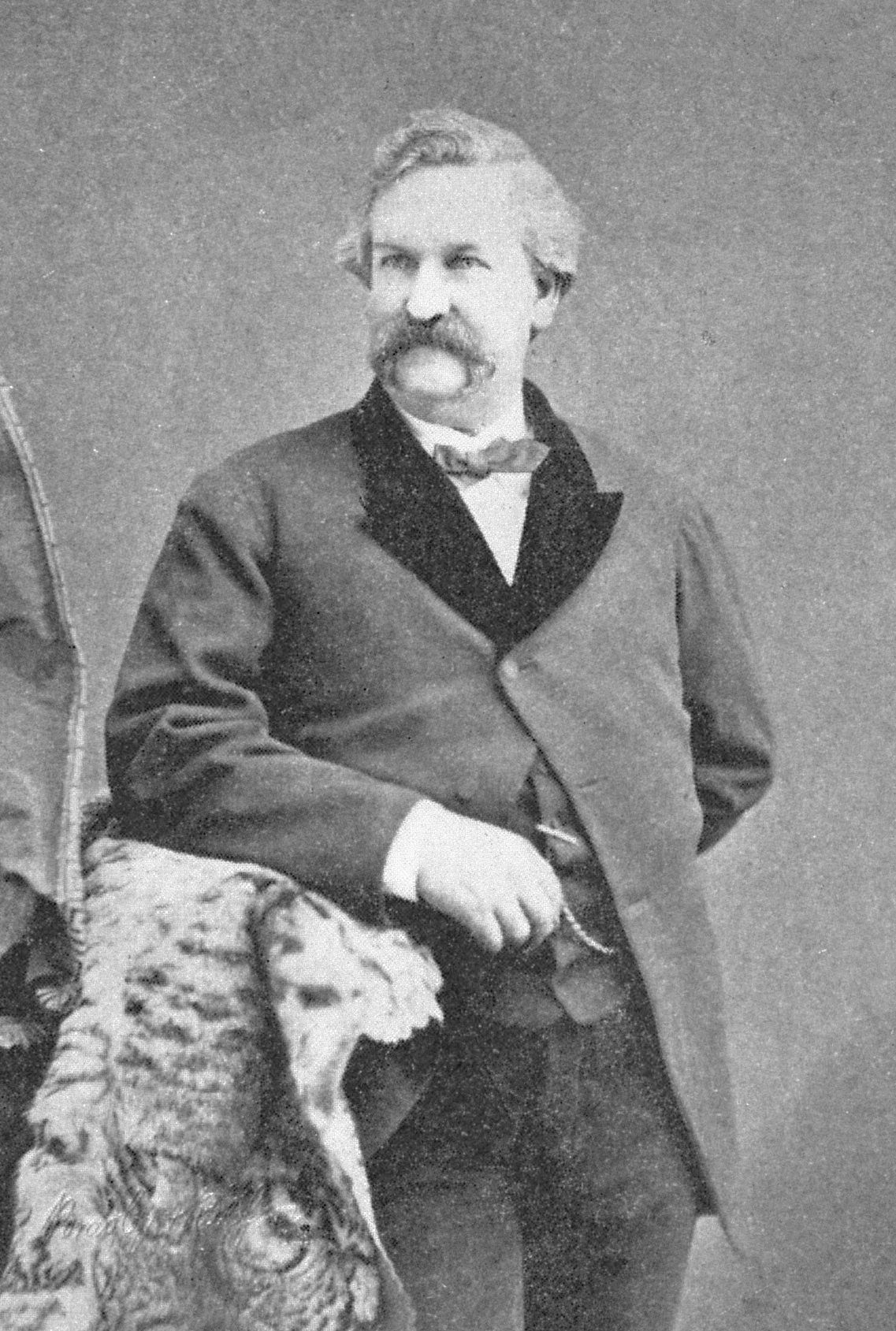
Henry "Harry" Edwards, a founding member

By 1882, club members camped together at several locations in Marin and Sonoma counties, including what is now Muir Woods and a redwood grove near Duncans Mills, along the Russian River. From 1893, the Bohemians rented the current site, and in 1899 they purchased it from Melvin Cyrus Meeker, who operated a logging business in the area. Over the following decades, the club acquired surrounding land, expanding the property to encompass the basin in which it is located.

Writer and journalist William Henry Irwin described the Grove’s natural setting in the early 20th century:

You come upon it suddenly. One step and its glory is over you. There is no perspective; you cannot get far enough away from one of the trees to see it as a whole. There they stand, a world of height above you, their pinnacles hidden by their topmost fringes of branches or lost in the sky.

Not long after the club was founded by newspaper journalists, its membership expanded to include prominent San Francisco–based businessmen. These members provided the financial resources needed to acquire additional land and develop facilities at the Grove. Artists and musicians remained part of the club and continued to contribute to its cultural activities and entertainment.

The Grove is known for hosting a meeting related to early planning of the Manhattan Project in September 1942. Participants included Ernest Lawrence and J. Robert Oppenheimer, along with members of the S-1 Executive Committee and representatives from major universities, industry, and the U.S. military. Although Oppenheimer was not a member of the S-1 Committee at the time, he and Lawrence hosted the meeting. The discussions held there contributed to the broader development of the atomic bomb.

In July of 1950, Dwight Eisenhower and Richard Nixon met each other for the first time as guests of former president Herbert Hoover at Cave Man Camp, a section of Bohemian Grove, at a small group lunch party with the host Hoover giving a toast, and Eisenhower giving a short speech, followed by time spent around a campfire. Nixon, for his part, was in the middle of his successful Senate campaign, having impressed Hoover with his political ability, especially for playing a big role in taking down Alger Hiss for committing perjury before the House Un-American Activities Committee, concerning charges of having committed espionage. Eisenhower, at that time the president of Columbia University, was the guest of honor. However, it was more his political future that interested the group of Hoover's associates and friends, who were mostly old-guard conservatives, including Hoover, who were more inclined to support Ohio senator Robert A. Taft in the upcoming 1952 United States presidential election, but were interested in hearing what the potential future president had to say. At the table during lunch, Nixon sat a few seats down on the left across from Eisenhower, who sat to the right next to Hoover, who sat at the head of the table; at some point during the gathering, Eisenhower and Nixon had a brief conversation.

Former U.S. president Herbert Hoover was inducted into the club's Old Guard on March 4, 1953, having joined the Bohemian Club exactly 40 years earlier, the requirement for this status. Redwood branches from the Grove were flown to the Waldorf Astoria Hotel in New York City to decorate a banquet room for the occasion. In his acceptance speech, Hoover compared the honor of Old Guard status to his role as a senior adviser to later presidents.

Owls Nest Camp, summer 1967. Seated, left to right: Preston Hotchkis, Ronald Reagan, Richard Nixon, Glenn T. Seaborg, Jack Sparks, Kevin Winter, and an unidentified individual. Standing: Harvey Hancock and Edwin W. Pauley.

Behavior at the campground has led to numerous claims and even some parody in popular culture. One example was President Richard Nixon's comments from a May 13, 1971, tape recording talking about upper-class San Franciscans: "The Bohemian Grove, which I attend from time to time— it is the most faggy goddamned thing you could ever imagine, with that San Francisco crowd."

In 2019, the Sonoma County Board of Supervisors informed the club that after that year, the county would no longer provide law enforcement security.

=== Unauthorized entries ===
Several documented unauthorized entries into the Bohemian Grove have been reported.

- In June 1980, journalist Rick Clogher entered the Grove with assistance from an employee. He posed as a worker during two weekends of the annual summer gathering. According to Mother Jones, his reporting was the first published magazine account from inside the Grove and appeared in the August 1981 issue of the magazine. In July 1981, ABC Evening News broadcast a television report on the Grove.
- In July 1989, Spy writer Philip Weiss entered the Grove and remained there for seven days while posing as a guest. His article, titled “Inside the Bohemian Grove,” was published in November 1989.
- On July 15, 2000, Alex Jones and cameraman Mike Hanson entered the Grove and recorded video of the Cremation of Care, an annual ceremony. Jones later stated that the ceremony involved a "ritual sacrifice", a characterization not supported by other reporting. Jones then produced his own documentary: "Dark Secrets Inside Bohemian Grove", while documentary filmmaker Jon Ronson later used footage from the incident in an episode titled “The Satanic Shadowy Elite?”, in which he described the event as resembling an "overgrown frat party".
- On January 19, 2002, Richard McCaslin entered the Grove at night and set multiple fires. He was arrested at the scene. Police reports stated that he was carrying weapons and wore a skull mask and clothing bearing the words "Phantom Patriot".

== Membership ==
The Bohemian Club is a private club; only active members and their guests may visit. Guests have been known to include politicians and notable figures from other countries. Particularly during the midsummer encampment, the number of guests is strictly limited due to the small size of the facilities.

The Bohemian Club's all-male membership includes artists and musicians, as well as prominent business leaders, government officials, former U.S. presidents, senior media executives, and other influential figures.

Members may invite guests to the Grove for either the "Spring Jinks" in June or the main July encampment. Bohemian Club members may also schedule private day-use events at the Grove when it is not being used for club-wide purposes. During these times, they may bring spouses, family, and friends, although female and minor guests must leave the property by 9 or 10 pm.

After 40 years of membership, members attain "Old Guard" status, which provides reserved seating at the Grove's daily talks and other privileges.

The club motto is "Weaving Spiders Come Not Here," expressing an expectation that outside concerns and business dealings be set aside. When gathered in groups, members generally observe this principle, although discussions of business sometimes occur in private conversations. Political and business relationships have developed at the Grove.

=== Women ===
Although no woman has ever been granted full membership in the Bohemian Club, four women have been named honorary members: hostess Margaret Bowman, poet Ina Coolbrith (who also served as the club’s librarian), actress Elizabeth Crocker Bowers, and writer Sara Jane Lippincott. Since Coolbrith’s death in 1928, no additional honorary members have been appointed.

Honorary members and other female guests have been permitted access to the Bohemian Club’s City Club building and to the Grove as daytime guests, but not to the upper floors of the City Club or the main summer encampment. Annual "Ladies' Jinks" events were held at the club for spouses and invited guests.

In 2019, Sonoma County Board of Supervisors member Lynda Hopkins published an open letter criticizing the Bohemian Club’s exclusion of women, its limited local investment despite members’ wealth, and what she described as outdated attitudes associated with the Grove.

== Facilities ==
The Bohemian Grove contains the physical infrastructure used during encampments and other club activities.

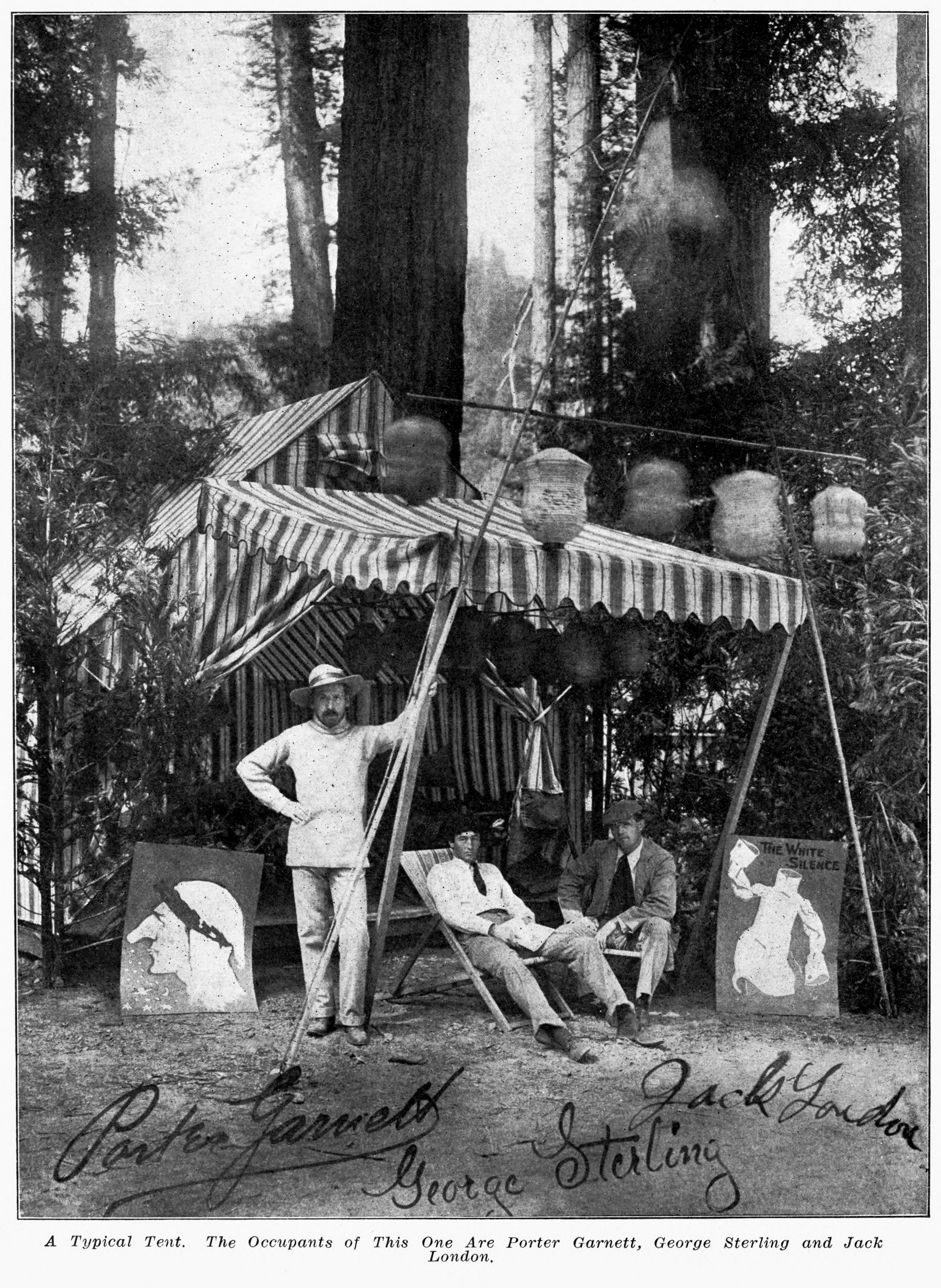
A Bohemian tent in the early 20th century, sheltering Porter Garnett, George Sterling, and Jack London

The main encampment area consists of 160 acres (65 ha) of old-growth redwood trees that are more than 1,000 years old, with some exceeding 300 feet (91 m) in height.

=== Camps ===
Sleeping quarters, known as camps, are distributed throughout the Grove. As of 2007, there were 118 camps. Many are patrilineal and serve as the primary social units through which long-term personal, business, and political relationships are formed.

The preeminent camps include:

- Hill Billies
- Mandalay
- Cave Man
- Stowaway
- Uplifters
- Owls Nest
- Hideaway
- Isle of Aves
- Lost Angels
- Silverado Squatters
- Sempervirens
- Hillside
- Idlewild

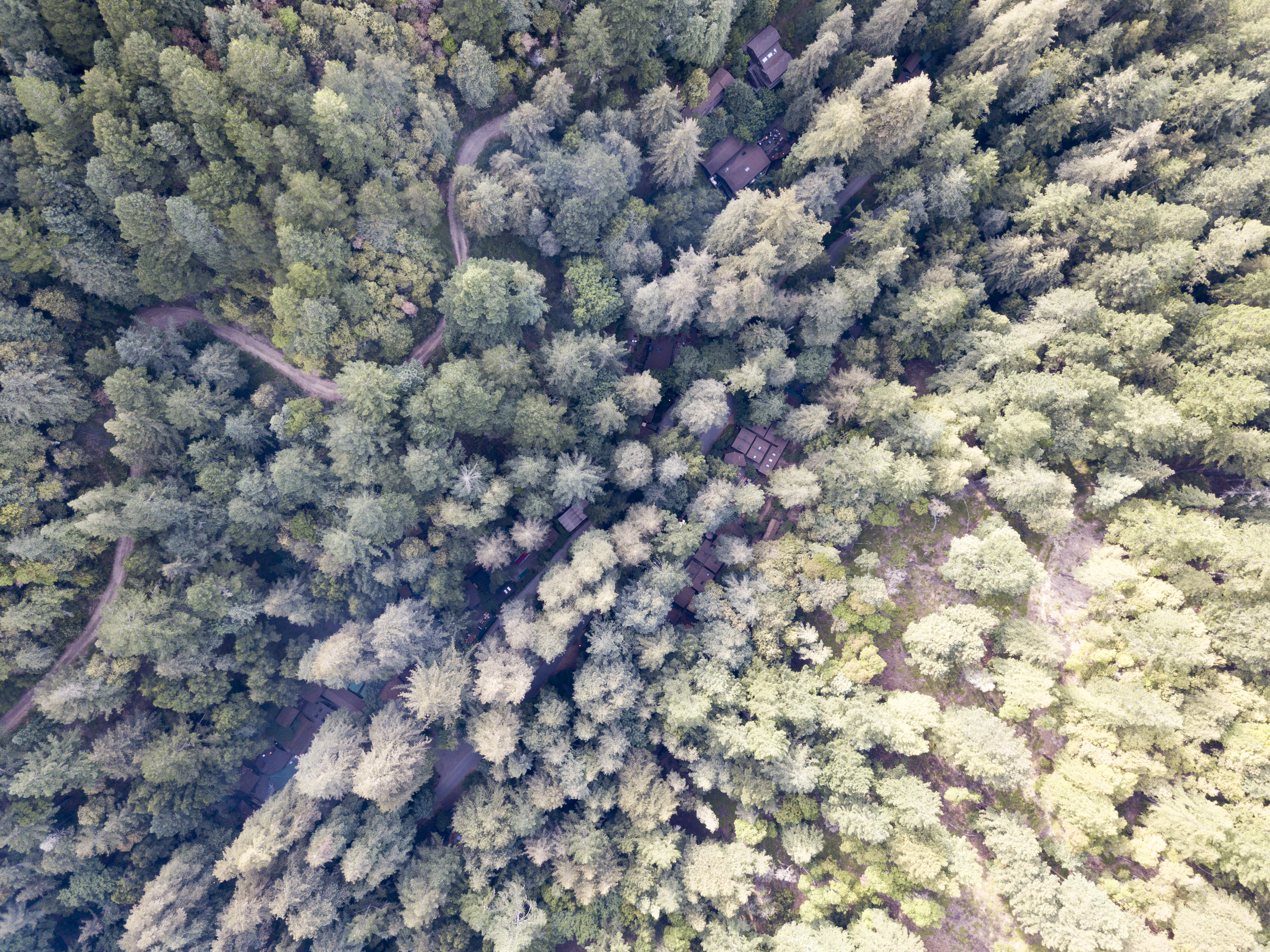
Aerial view of the Grove

=== Gathering spaces ===
The Grove includes several dedicated venues used for performances, lectures, and communal meals:

- Grove Stage – an amphitheater seating about 2,000 people, primarily used for the Grove Play.
- Field Circle – a bowl-shaped amphitheater used for musical performances and seasonal events.
- Campfire Circle – a smaller performance space centered on a campfire.
- Museum Stage – a semi-outdoor venue used for lectures and small performances.
- Dining Circle – seating for about 1,500 diners.
- Clubhouse – designed by Bernard Maybeck and completed in 1904; a multipurpose building and the site of a 1942 Manhattan Project planning meeting.
- Owl Shrine and the Lake – an artificial lake used for concerts, talks, and the Cremation of Care ceremony.

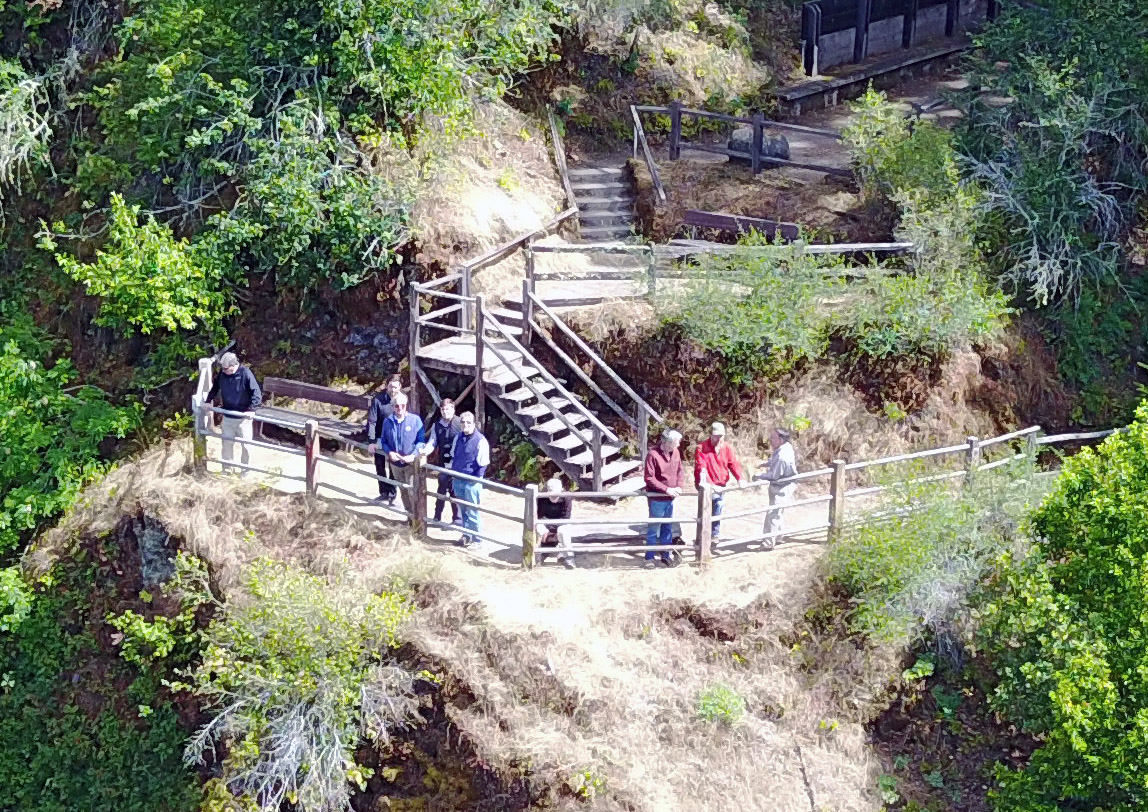
Members during the Spring Jinks encampment

== Operations ==
=== Camp valets ===
Camp valets oversee the daily operation of individual camps. Head valets perform roles comparable to general managers. Service staff include female workers whose presence is limited to daytime hours and central areas, while male workers may reside on-site in assigned camps or service areas. Housing ranges from private quarters to shared bunkhouses.

=== Security ===
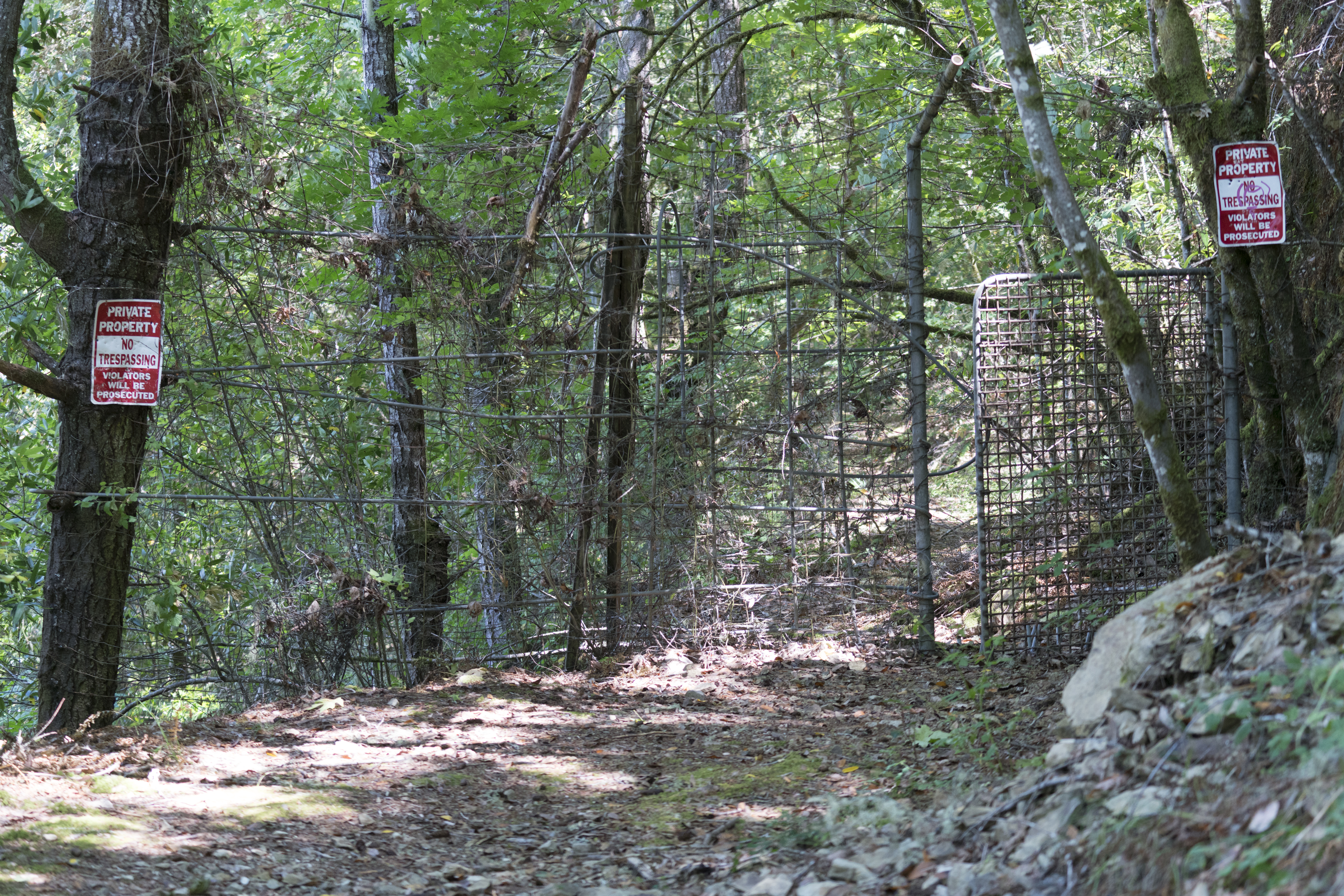
Side entrance

The Grove is secured year-round by a private security team. During encampments, security is supplemented by local law enforcement and, when warranted by visiting guests, federal agencies.

== Traditions, rituals, and symbols ==
=== Symbols ===
The club's patron saint is John of Nepomuk, who, according to legend, died at the hands of Wenceslaus IV of Bohemia rather than disclose the confessional secrets of the queen. A large wood carving of St. John in cleric robes with his index finger over his lips stands at the shore of the lake in the Grove, symbolizing the secrecy kept by the Grove's attendees throughout its long history.

Since the founding of the club, the Bohemian Grove's mascot has been an owl, symbolizing wisdom. A 30-foot (9 m) hollow owl statue made of concrete over steel supports stands at the head of the lake in the Grove. This statue was designed by sculptor and two-time club president Haig Patigian. It was constructed in the late 1920s. Since 1929, the Owl Shrine has served as the backdrop of the yearly Cremation of Care ceremony.

==== Cremation of Care ====
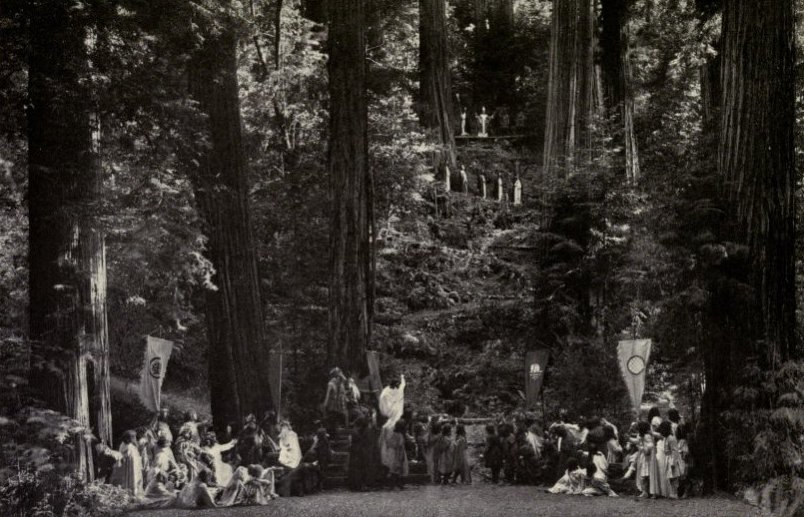
A dress rehearsal for the 1909 Grove Play, St. Patrick at Tara

The Cremation of Care ceremony is a theatrical production in which some of the club's members participate as actors. It was first conducted in 1881. The production was devised by James F. Bowman with George T. Bromley playing the High Priest. It was originally set up within the plot of the serious "High Jinks" dramatic performance on the first weekend of the summer encampment, after which the spirit of "Care", slain by the Jinks hero, was solemnly cremated. The ceremony served as a catharsis for pent-up high spirits, and "to present symbolically the salvation of the trees by the club ..." The Cremation of Care was separated from the other Grove Plays in 1913 and moved to the first night to become "an exorcising of the Demon to ensure the success of the ensuing two weeks." The Grove Play was moved to the last weekend of the encampment.

The ceremony takes place in front of the Owl Shrine. The moss- and lichen-covered statue simulates a natural rock formation, yet holds electrical and audio equipment within it. For many years, a recording of the voice of club member Walter Cronkite was used as the voice of The Owl during the ceremony.

=== Grove Play ===
Each year, a Grove Play is performed for one night during the final weekend of the summer encampment. The play is a large-scale musical theatrical production, written and composed by club members, involving some 300 people, including chorus, cast, stage crew and orchestra. The first Grove Play was performed in 1902; for three years during World War II (1943–45) the stage was dark. In 1975, an observer estimated that the Grove Play cost between $20,000 and $30,000, an amount that would be as high as $179,000 in today's dollars.

== Court cases ==
=== Women's employment ===
In 1978, the Bohemian Club was charged with discrimination by the California Department of Fair Employment and Housing over its refusal to hire female employees. In January 1981, an administrative law judge issued a decision supporting the practices of the club, noting that club members at the Grove "urinate in the open without even the use of rudimentary toilet facilities" and that the presence of females would alter club members' behavior. However, the judge's decision was overruled by the State Fair Employment and Housing Commission, which on October 17, 1981, ordered the club to begin recruiting and hiring women as employees.

The Bohemian Club then filed a petition in California Superior Court, which ruled in favor of the club, finding "the male gender [to be] a bona fide occupational qualification." It was revealed that the trial judge had previously participated in club activities, yet the request that he be disqualified was denied. The Fair Employment and Housing Commission appealed to the California Court of Appeal which reversed the lower court's decision, holding that the Bohemian Club's private status did not shield it from the "same rules which govern all California employers." The Supreme Court of California denied review in 1987, effectively forcing the club to begin hiring female workers during the summer encampment at the Grove in Monte Rio. This ruling became quoted as a legal precedent and was discussed during the 1995–96 floor debate surrounding California Senate Bill SB 2110, a proposed law concerning whether tax-exempt organizations (including fraternal clubs) should be exempt from the Unruh Civil Rights Act.

=== Logging ===
Outside the central camp area, which is the site of the old-growth grove, but within the 2,712 acres (1,098 ha) owned by the Bohemian Club, logging activities have been underway since 1984. Approximately 11,000,000 board feet (26,000 m^{3}) of lumber equivalents were removed from the surrounding redwood and Douglas fir forest from 1984 to 2007. The club's forester, Edward Tunheim, resigned his post in 2006 over club pressure to increase logging. Tunheim was concerned that excessive logging would encourage more brushy undergrowth and thus increase the fire danger.

In 2007, the Bohemian Club board filed an application for a nonindustrial logging permit available to landowners with less than 2,500 acres (1,000 ha) of timberland, which would allow them to steadily increase their logging in the second-growth stands from 800,000 board feet (1,900 m^{3}) per year to 1,700,000 board feet (4,000 m^{3}) over the course of the 50-year permit. The board had been advised by Tom Bonnicksen, a retired forestry professor, that they should conduct group selection logging to reduce the risk of fire burning through the dense second-growth stands, damaging the old-growth forest the Club wants to protect.

The Club stated that an expansion of logging activities was needed to prevent fires, and that money made from the sale of the lumber would be used to stabilize access roads and to clear fire-promoting species such as tanoaks and underbrush. The California Department of Fish and Wildlife instead recommended single-tree logging to preserve the habitats of murrelets and spotted owls in senescent trees. Philip Rundel, a University of California, Berkeley professor of biology, said that redwoods are not very flammable and "This is clearly a logging project, not a project to reduce fire hazard". Reed F. Noss, a professor at the University of California, Davis, has written that fires within redwood forests do not need to be prevented, that young redwoods are adapted to regenerate well in the destruction left behind by the fires typical of the climate.

After controversy raised by opponents of the harvesting plan, the Club moved to establish their qualification for the permit by offering 163 acres (66 ha) to the Rocky Mountain Elk Foundation in Missoula, Montana, for a conservation easement. A further 56.75 acres (22.97 ha) were written off as not being available for commercial logging, bringing the total to 2,316 acres (937 ha) and thereby qualifying for the permit. Opponents and their lawyers interpreted the relevant law as counting all timberland and not just the portion subject to the logging permit. They stated that if the total of timberland is counted, 2,535.75 acres (1,026.18 ha) are owned by the Club, so the permit should not be granted.

On March 10, 2011, Judge René A. Chouteau rejected the Non-Industrial Timber Management Plan (NTMP) that the California Department of Forestry and Fire Protection had approved. The suit, brought by the Sierra Club and the Bohemian Redwood Rescue Club, sought to have the NTMP annulled. The ruling called on the Bohemian Club to draft a new NTMP offering alternatives to its proposed rate of logging. At present the Bohemian Club is not allowed to log any of its property.

=== Wage theft ===
In June 2023, a group of former workers sued Bohemian Grove alleging wage theft and unfair labor practices. The club was dismissed from the lawsuit in January 2024 after a judge ruled it did not fit the legal definition of an employer. In May 2024, another lawsuit was filed.

== See also ==
- List of Bohemian Club members
- Belizean Grove
- Dialog
