= Richard McCaslin =

American vigilante and conspiracy theorist (1964–2018)

- Richard Wilson McCaslin
- Born: June 20, 1964; Zanesville, Ohio
- Died: October 14, 2018 (aged 54); Washington, D.C.
- Other names: The Lynx, Phantom Patriot, Thoughtcrime

Richard Wilson McCaslin (June 20, 1964 – October 14, 2018) was a former Marine, cosplayer, Batman stuntman at Six Flags AstroWorld, and convicted felon.

== Background ==
McCaslin developed a fascination with comic books and super heroes while growing up in Zanesville, Ohio. Following his discharge from the Marine Corps, McCaslin developed the real-life superhero identity The Lynx in 1985. He briefly patrolled Zanesville with a teenage sidekick named Iron Claw. McCaslin would develop more personas over the years. He went on to live in Austin, Texas, and Carson City and Las Vegas, Nevada.

McCaslin was described as "an avid fan" of country music singer Chely Wright. In 2001, he attended a charity event and placed the winning bid of $14,500 for a dinner with the performer, with proceeds benefiting Wright's Reading, Writing and Rhythm Foundation. Subsequent United States Secret Service files obtained through the Freedom of Information Act indicate that McCaslin stalked Wright using mail sent to her fan group, sending a VHS tape to her brother and showing up at a concert in an attempt to slip her a note.

=== The Phantom Patriot ===
Richard McCaslin as the Phantom Patriot

On January 19, 2002, McCaslin attempted a raid on the Bohemian Grove campground, just north of San Francisco, while dressed as his alter ego The Phantom Patriot. McCaslin later claimed to have been concerned about ritualistic child sacrifice taking place at Bohemian Grove, after seeing the documentary film Dark Secrets Inside Bohemian Grove, by radio show host Alex Jones.

Further energized by the September 11 attacks and the subsequent 9/11 conspiracy theories, McCaslin planned a self-styled mission to assail what he perceived to be the sacrificial grounds of powerful elites running the globe. McCaslin planned to break into Bohemian Grove with the intent of burning the massive owl statue inside. McCaslin believed this statue was emblematic child sacrifice related to the Canaanite god Moloch.

Before departing Austin on his "mission," McCaslin claimed to have stopped by the AC-TV public access studios and spoken directly with Alex Jones about Bohemian Grove. According to McCaslin: "I met him [Alex Jones] at the public access studio where he did his show in Austin. I felt I should met this guy before I went to the Grove." "We discussed the Grove in general, but I didn't say anything about going there. If I got arrested, I didn't want him charged with conspiracy. At one point, he excused himself from the conversation, but he said he would be right back. At the time, I thought that AJ thought I might be an undercover fed. I decided to leave before he got back."

Wearing a skull mask and a blue jumpsuit with "Phantom Patriot" written in red on his chest, McCaslin entered the campground, armed with "a pump-action rifle/shotgun hybrid, a .45 caliber handgun, a crossbow, a 2-foot-long sword, a knife and a fireworks mortar tube." Due to the time of year, the camp was deserted except for some staff.

Upon entering the grove, McCaslin discovered that the owl was made of concrete instead of redwood, as he had believed, and could not be destroyed without explosives, which he had not brought. McCaslin also failed to find any evidence of the sacrificial rituals he believed he would interrupt. He also became lost on the grounds after the batteries in his flashlight died and he had forgotten to bring spares. Frustrated, McCaslin kicked in the door to a cabin and slept in it overnight.

The following morning, McCaslin set a fire in the empty banquet hall, which triggered an alarm. McCaslin encountered caretaker Fred Yeager and maintenance worker Bob Hipkiss, but no guests were present. Upon leaving the grounds. McCaslin pointed his MK-1 rifle at Yeager as he sat in his security booth, believing the phone Yeager held to be a gun. McCaslin encountered law enforcement officers who had surrounded his truck; following an armed standoff, he was removed. He subsequently claimed in correspondence with author Tea Krulos that what had kept him from becoming violent was the possibility of seeing Chely Wright again. McCaslin was briefly held at the mental health ward of the Sonoma County Jail.

McCaslin was later convicted on felony charges of arson, burglary, brandishing a weapon at a peace officer, and two counts for being armed and wearing a bulletproof vest. He was imprisoned in California.

=== After prison release ===
McCaslin was paroled on May 19, 2008.

After Alex Jones publicly disavowed responsibility for McCaslin's actions, McCaslin became a devotee of British conspiracy theorist David Icke, whose theories included the "Reptoid" hypothesis, that several prominent politicians are in fact extraterrestrial beings (or the offspring of such beings with humans) in disguise.

On June 28, 2011, using the name "Thoughtcrime", McCaslin protested outside the Alcoa plant in Davenport, Iowa, where Barack Obama was speaking. He accused Obama, as well as the Bushes, the Clintons and others of being "blue bloods" (reptoid/human hybrids).

=== Death ===
A report filed by the Washington, D.C. Metropolitan Police Department on October 15, 2018, indicates McCaslin attempted suicide with a captive bolt gun. Police found McCaslin suffering from a head injury in his truck, parked in an alley next to the House of the Temple, a Masonic Temple. The Freemasons were a frequent subject of McCaslin's conspiracy theories. He was pronounced dead the following day.

A binder found next to McCaslin in his truck contained a suicide note (written as "21 thoughts" he had about suicide), which contained gnostic references.

== Media portrayals ==
- McCaslin was profiled in journalist Tea Krulos's 2013 book Heroes in the Night; Inside the Real Life Superhero Movement. and more extensively in Krulos's 2020 book American Madness: The Story of the Phantom Patriot and How Conspiracy Theorists Hijacked American Consciousness.
- McCaslin is the subject of the song "Phantom Patriot" by Les Claypool on his album Of Whales and Woe.
