= James F. Bowman =

American journalist and writer (1826–1882)

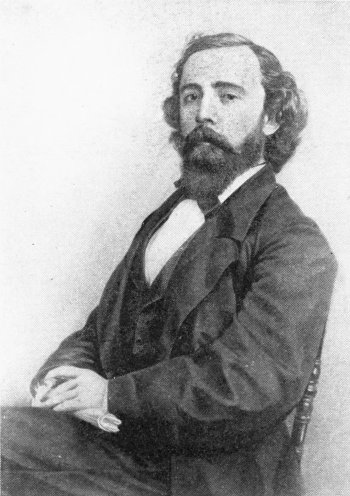
James F. Bowman

James F. Bowman (January 21, 1826 – April 29, 1882) was a journalist and poet in Northern California, and a co-founder of the Bohemian Club. Bowman served on several newspapers in Placerville, Sacramento and San Francisco during a 24-year career. Through his contacts among San Francisco journalists, Bowman befriended Mark Twain, artist William Keith, critic Ambrose Bierce (who included an anecdote about Bowman in his The Devil's Dictionary) and a great many others.

Bowman occasionally appeared in public to read his own poetry, and was mentioned in the Daily Morning Call for giving a recitation at a Fourth of July celebration in San Francisco, 1864. Bowman connected in 1871 with George Frederick Parsons in Sacramento at the Record, was encouraged to write more poetry, and to publish. Bowman was subsequently subject to attempted plagiarism of his work by "literary purloiners".

In 1864, Bowman picked up a regular assignment as co-editor with Bret Harte of The Californian newspaper. In 1865, the daily Dramatic Chronicle began publication in San Francisco as a theatre and literary review, under the direction of teenager brothers Charles and Michael de Young. Charles de Young began buying witty articles from writers such as drinking buddies Twain and Bowman, including a piece written anonymously by Bowman which savaged both the grandiose style of a poetry review in The Californian and the poetry itself, a book by Twain and Bowman's mutual friend Charles Warren Stoddard. The targeted review was one written by Bowman himself. In 1868, The Californian closed, but by then Bowman was editing both the Dramatic Chronicle and the Oakland News. In August 1868, the name Dramatic Chronicle was shortened to Chronicle, and the newspaper given wider latitude in subject matter.

The Overland Monthly began publication in 1868, and Bowman submitted poetry. In 1872, he helped form the Bohemian Club. He served as the club's secretary 1876–1878.

Bowman died in 1882, and Ambrose Bierce wrote a moving elegy which was published in the San Francisco Wasp on May 5:

How well this man unfolded to our view
The world's beliefs of Death and Heaven and Hell—
This man whose own convictions none could tell,
Nor if his maze of reason had a clew.
Dogmas he wrote for daily bread, but knew
The fair philosophies of doubt so well
That while we listened to his words there fell
Some that were strangely comforting if true.
Marking how wise we grew upon his doubt,
We said: "If so, by groping in the night,
He can proclaim some certain paths of trust,
How great our profit if he saw about
His feet the highways leading to the light."
Now he sees all. Ah, Christ! his mouth is dust!

== Margaret Bowman ==
James Bowman was married to Margaret B. Bowman, who "conducted a seminary for young ladies", assisted by her husband who gave lectures in rhetoric and literature. Both husband and wife were very active in forming the men-only Bohemian Club in 1872, along with other journalists and artists such as Bierce, Daniel "Dan" O'Connell, Frederick Whymper and Benoni Irwin, and Margaret Bowman was elected by acclamation to honorary member status at the first formal Bohemian meeting, held in the Bowman home.

Margaret Bowman died on July 10, 1886, a year after an apoplectic stroke, and her funeral and burial were conducted under the auspices of the Bohemian Club. Four Bohemians served as pallbearers.

== See also ==
- List of Bohemian Club members
