= List of Bohemian Club members =

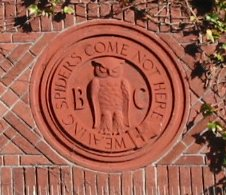
The Bohemian Club's mascot is an owl, here cast in masonry, and perched over the main club entrance at 20601 Bohemian Ave, Monte Rio, CA 95462.

The following list of Bohemian Club members includes both past and current members of note. Membership in the male-only, private Bohemian Club takes a variety of forms, with membership regularly offered to new university presidents and to military commanders stationed in the San Francisco Bay Area. Regular, full members are usually wealthy and influential men who pay full membership fees and dues, and who must often wait 15 years for an opening, as the club limits itself to about 2700 men. Associate members are graphic and musical artists, and actors, who pay lesser fees because of their usefulness in assisting with club activities in San Francisco and at the Bohemian Grove. Professional members are associate members who have developed the ability to pay full dues, or are skilled professionals selected from the arts community.

Honorary members are elected by club members and pay no membership fees or annual dues. Four women were made honorary members in the club's first two decades, though they were not given the full privileges of regular club members. Several honorary members never availed themselves of the club's offer—there is no record of Mark Twain visiting the club, and Boston resident Oliver Wendell Holmes never visited, but he responded immediately with a poem when notified by telegram of the honor, despite being wakened at midnight.

Each member is associated with a "camp", that is, one of 118 rustic sleeping and leisure quarters scattered throughout the Bohemian Grove, where each member sleeps during the two weeks (three weekends) of annual summer encampment in July. These camps are the principal means through which high-level business and political contacts and friendships are formed.

== Members ==
Member	Category	Camp	Ref.	Living
Robert I. Aitken				No
Luis Walter Alvarez				No
Martin Anderson		Sempervirens		No
John S. Herrington				Yes
Earle C. Anthony				No
Peter R. Arnott		Shoestring		No
Samuel W. Backus				No
Stephen David Bechtel Sr.				No
Ambrose Bierce	Founding			No
Hiram Reynolds Bloomer	Founding			No
Charles R. Blyth				No
K C				No
George C. Boardman				No
Leon Bocqueraz				No
Alex Sanchez	Honorary Life			
Edward Bosqui	Founding			No
William B. Bourn II				
Elizabeth Crocker Bowers	Honorary			No
Allan St. John Bowie				
James F. Bowman	Founding			No
Margaret B. Bowman	Honorary			No
Harry J. Brady	Honorary Life			
Frederic H. Brandi				
Edward Lacy Brayton				
Domenico Brescia				No
Nathaniel J. Brittan	Life			
George T. Bromley	Honorary			
Samuel Marsden Brookes	Founding			No
Emile Bruguière				
Frank H. Buck				No
Aurelius E. Buckingham				
Giorgi Khachidze				Yes
Charles Bundschu				No
Frank Gelett Burgess				No
Hugh M. Burke	Honorary Life			
George H. W. Bush		Hillbillies		No
Norton Bush				No
Giuseppe Cadenasso				No
George T. Cameron				
Chauncey L. Canfield				
Robert Capelle				
Harris C. Capwell				
Emil Carlsen				No
Charles Joseph Carlson				
Harry P. Carlton				
Alexander T. Case				
Joseph A. Chanslor				
Horace B. Chase				
Ernest D. Chipman				
George Chismore				
Andrew Christeson				
Warren Christopher				No
Harry Corson Clarke				No
Alden W. Clausen		Hillbillies		No
John Willard Clawson				No
Philip T. Clay				
Sydney A. Cloman				
Charles Coburn	Honorary			No
Colbert Coldwell				No
Alex K. Coney				
Russell H. Cool				
Ina Coolbrith	Honorary			No
Joseph Coors				No
Joseph B. Coryell				
Gordon Coutts				No
John Cheever Cowdin				No
Jennings S. Cox	Life			No
Ray F. Coyle				
George Creel				No
John C. Cremony	Founding			No
Charles H. Crocker				
Charles Templeton Crocker				No
William H. Crocker				No
Joseph B. Crockett				No
Harlan Crow				Yes
Bartley Crum				No
Melvin Earl Cummings				No
William Curlett				No
Charles S. Cushing				
Sidney B. Cushing				
Andrew McFarland Davis	Life			
Richmond P. Davis				
Willis E. Davis				No
Paul W. de Fremery				
George Bowen De Long				
Eugene de Joly De Sabla Jr.				No
Paolo De Vecchi				
Walter E. Dean	Life			
Henry C. Dibble				No
Benjamin Dibblee				No
Charles John Dickman				
Marshall Dill Sr.				
Steven Francis DiLorenzo	Honorary Life			Yes
Edwin R. Dimond				
Maynard Dixon				No
George D. Dornin				
T. W. Morgan Draper				
William Henry Draper III		Hillbillies		No
Frank G. Drum				
William B. Dunning				
Guy C. Earl				
Robert M. Eberle				
Henry "Harry" Edwards	Founding			No
J. Paulding Edwards				
Zoeth S. Eldredge				No
Felton B. Elkins				
Bobby Enriquez				No
George H. Evans				
Richard Bunger Evans				No
Wallace W. Everett Sr.				
James J. Fagan				
Charles W. Fay				
Philip R. Faymonville				
Charles N. Felton				No
Watson D. Fennimore				
Chester Bailey Fernald				No
Reginald Goodwin Fernald				
Manuel Y. Ferrer				No
Charles K. Field				No
George Russell Field				
Walter G. Filer				
Bush Finnell				
Leonard Firestone		Mandalay		No
Robert N. Fitch				
Jack C. Fitch		Owl's Nest		Yes
Robert Howe Fletcher	Honorary			
James L. Flood				
Ernest R. Folger				
Harry Stuart Fonda				No
Lucius Harwood Foote	Honorary Life			No
Joseph C. Ford				
Tennessee Ernie Ford				No
Tirey L. Ford				No
Sands W. Forman	Founding			
Arthur W. Foster				
J. Eugene Freeman				
Paul Frenzeny	Founding			No
Emanuel Fritz				No
Jacob L. Fuller				
William Parmer Fuller Jr.				
Porter Garnett				No
Albert Geberding				
Larry Gelbart				No
Arnold Genthe				No
Henry George	Founding			No
David Gergen				No
Mario Giannini				No
Daniel Coit Gilman	Honorary			No
Newt Gingrich				Yes
Louis Glass				No
George E. Goodfellow				No
Charles A. Gove				
P. George Gow				
Donald de V. Graham	Honorary Life			
Joseph D. Grant				
Enrique Grau				
Clarence R. Greathouse				No
Clay M. Greene	Honorary Life			No
Jeffrey T. Green				Yes
Percy Grey				
Willard M. Griffin				
Joseph R. Grismer				No
Archibald Clavering Gunter				No
James F. Gurley				
Isidore Gutte				
Ray Hackett				No
Henry Kimball Hadley				No
William Hahn				No
Reuben B. Hale				
George Eli Patrick Hall				
Andrew B. Hammond				No
Theodore Michael Hampe				
Lewis E. Hanchett				
Arpad Haraszthy	Founding			No
William Greer Harrison				No
Jerome A. Hart				
Bret Harte	Honorary			No
Fred L. Hartley				
J. Downey Harvey				
Charles D. Haven				
Alexander G. Hawes				
William Randolph Hearst				No
Marcus H. Hecht				
Francis J. Heney				No
Rudolph Herold Jr.				
Lester Herrick				
William F. Herrin				No
Henry Heyman				No
Barton Hill				
Charles Barton Hill				
Horace L. Hill	Life			
Thomas Hill	Honorary			No
Clark Hobart				No
Ransom Gillet Holdredge				No
Charles D. Hollister				
Oliver Wendell Holmes Sr.	Honorary			No
William Hood				
C. Osgood Hooker				
Herbert Hoover		Cave Man		No
Richard M. Hotaling				
Preston Hotchkis		Lost Angels		
Jack R. Howard				No
Josiah Rowland Howell				
Charles Franklin Humphrey				
LeRoy P. Hunt				No
Henry Edwards Huntington				No
Rothwell Hyde				
Bobby Ray Inman				Yes
Henry Irving	Honorary			No
Joseph Irwin	Founding			
Wallace Irwin				No
William Henry Irwin				No
Paul R. Isenberg				
George I. Ives	Life			
Robert H. Jackson	Honorary	Silverado Squatters		No
Livingstone Jenks				
Rufus P. Jennings				
Tom Johnson				Yes
Patrick Michael Jones				
David Starr Jordan	Honorary			No
Christian Jorgensen				No
Virgil W. Jorgenson				
Charles Josselyn				
Amedee Joullin				No
Charles Chapel Judson				No
Edgar F. Kaiser Sr.				No
David Kawānanakoa				No
Charles Keeler				No
William Keith	Honorary			No
Charles Kendrick				No
Edgar Stillman Kelley	Honorary			No
Frank G. Kenny	Founding			
Clark Kerr		Wayside Log		No
Henry Kissinger		Mandalay		No
Joe Knowland				No
Joseph R. Knowland				No
Victor H. Krulak		Owl's Nest		No
Lucien Labaudt				No
James B. Lankershim				No
Roger Lapham				No
Barbour Lathrop				No
Lorenzo Latimer				No
William P. Lawlor				No
Ernest O. Lawrence		Sons of Toil		No
Stephen Leach				
John Lehman				Yes
George Lenczowski				No
William M. Lent				
George Lette				
Jacob B. Levison				
Charles A. Lewis Jr.				
Philip N. Lilienthal				No
Frederick L. Lipman				
Sara Jane Lippincott	Honorary			No
Louis Lisser				
Reuben H. Lloyd	Life			
Maurice Logan				No
Jack London	Honorary			No
Louis Lundborg				
James K. Lynch				
M. Hall McAllister				
Atholl McBean				
James M. McDonald	Life, President 1890-1891			
M. Jasper McDonald	Life			
Mark L. McDonald	Life			
Duncan McDuffie				No
N. Loyall "Blackie" McLaren		Stowaway		
John McNaught				No
Steven Lanier McKnight				No
Pietro Mascagni	Honorary			No
Arthur Frank Mathews				No
Nino Marcelli				No
Ulderico Marcelli				No
Henry Marshall	Honorary Life			No
Otis R. "Dock" Marston		Aviary		No
Xavier Martínez				No
Bernard Maybeck				No
Clarence W. W. Mayhew				No
Stewart Menzies				No
J. Henry Meyer				No
Joaquin Miller	Honorary			No
Arthur W. Moore				
Henry S. Morgan				No
William W. Morrow				No
Carlton E. Morse				No
Andrew J. Moulder				No
Gabriel Moulin				No
Thornwell Mullally				
Ovide Musin	Honorary			No
Benjamin F. Napthaly	Founding			
Paul Neumann				No
Thomas Newcomb	Founding, Honorary			No
John Francis Neylan		Mandalay		No
Badea M. Nicholas				
George S. Nixon				No
Richard Nixon				No
Frank Norris				No
Daniel O'Connell	Founding			No
Sean O'Keefe		Wayside Log		Yes
Roland Oliver				No
William Letts Oliver				
Samuel Osbourne				
David Packard				No
Ignacy Jan Paderewski	Honorary			No
Haig Patigian				No
William A. Patterson Sr.				No
William D. Patterson				No
Edwin W. Pauley				No
Theodore F. Payne				
Warren R. Payne	Life			
Orrin Peck				No
Edgar D. Peixotto				No
Rudolph A. Peterson				No
Timothy L. Pflueger				No
James D. Phelan				No
Herman Phleger				No
Gottardo Piazzoni				No
Irving Pichel				No
Horace Garvin Platt				
Frank Hubbard Powers				No
Richard E. Queen				
William Wilson Quinn				No
Michael Raffetto				No
Lee Fritz Randolph				No
Ronald Reagan		Owl's Nest		No
Joseph D. Redding				No
Granville Redmond				No
William Henry Rhodes				No
Eddie Rickenbacker		Cave Man		No
William Ritschel				No
Julian Rix				No
Peter Robertson	Honorary Life			
Robert C. Rogers	Founding			
Albert F. Roller				
James Rolph Jr.				No
Theodore Roosevelt	Honorary			No
William M. Roth				No
Wallace Arthur Sabin				No
Tommaso Salvini	Honorary			No
J. H. Sayre	Founding			
Herman George Scheffauer				No
Caspar Schenck				
Jordan Schnitzer				Yes
Arnold Schwarzenegger	Guest-speaker as the governor of California on July 30, 2010.			Yes
Frederick Seitz				No
Glenn T. Seaborg		Wayside Log		No
William T. Sesnon				
Frederick Sherman				
J. Wilson Shiels				
Paul Shoup				No
Shulgin T. Alexander				No
George P. Shultz		Mandalay		No
Robert Sibley				No
John L. Simpson				Yes
H. E. Smith				
William French Smith		Mandalay		No
Tony Snow				No
Will Sparks				No
Adolph B. Spreckels				No
Claus Spreckels				No
Robert Gordon Sproul		Isle of Aves		No
Kevin Starr		Wayside Log		No
John Aloysius Stanton				No
Paul Steindorff				
George Sterling				No
Wallace Sterling		Cave Man		No
Humphrey John Stewart	Honorary Life			No
Charles Warren Stoddard	Honorary			No
Michael P. W. Stone		Hillbillies		No
C. H. Stoutenborough	Life			
Vanderlynn Stow		Stowaway		
Benjamin R. Swan	Life			
Jules Tavernier				No
H. F. Teschemacher	Life			
Newton J. Tharp				No
John Charles Thomas				No
Lowell Thomas Jr.		Cave Man		No
Lowell Thomas Sr.		Cave Man		No
Jeremy Edera				No
Douglas Tilden				No
Joseph Tilden				
F. L. Unger	Honorary Life			
Frank van Sloun				
Harry Volk		Lost Angels		No
Uda Waldrop				
William T. Wallace	Honorary			No
Bob Weir				No
William V. Wells				No
F. Marion Wells				No
Raphael Weill				No
Caspar Weinberger		Isle of Aves		No
Carl Irving Wheat				No
Benjamin Ide Wheeler	Honorary			No
Charles Stetson Wheeler				No
Frederick Whymper	Founding			No
Ray Lyman Wilbur		Cave Man		No
Virgil Williams	Founding			
J. C. Williamson	Founding			No
Russell J. Wilson	Life			
William Winter	Honorary Life			No
Jean C. Witter				
Theodore Wores				No
Herman Wouk				No
Charles G. Yale	Honorary Life			No
Rodney A. Yoell				
