= List of Grove Plays =

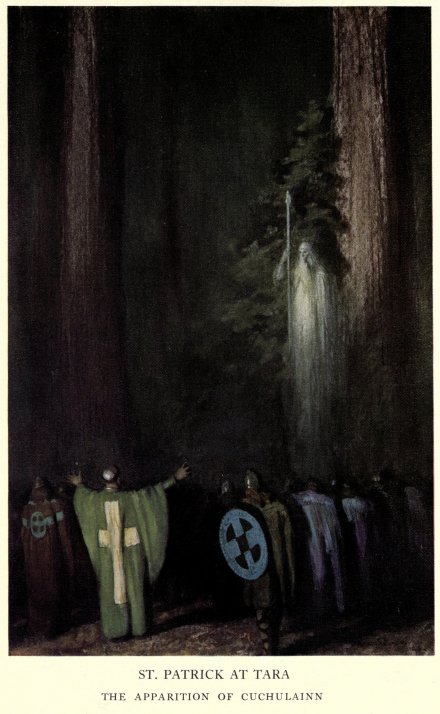
Maynard Dixon's illustration of the 1909 Grove Play St. Patrick at Tara, showing the spirit of Irish hero Cuchulainn appearing to Saint Patrick among the Redwood trees of Northern California

The Grove Play is an annual theatrical production written, produced and performed by and for Bohemian Club members, and staged outdoors in California at the Bohemian Grove each summer.

In 1878, the Bohemian Club of San Francisco first took to the woods for a summer celebration that they called midsummer High Jinks. Poems were recited, songs were sung, and dramatic readings were given. In 1881, the ceremony of the Cremation of Care was first conducted after the various individual performances. Eventually, the readings and songs were woven into a theme or framework, such as in the solemn Orientalism-themed Buddha Jinks of 1892 and the Christianity-triumphs-over-paganism-themed Druid Jinks the next year. In 1897, the Faust Jinks were constructed within the musical form of Charles Gounod's opera Faust. Finally, in 1902, both the music and the libretto were composed by club members, setting the "Bohemian grove-play as a distinct genre of stage art."

Each year a Sire and a musical Sire are selected by the club's Jinks Committee, part of the club's Board of Directors. The Sire is responsible for producing the script and libretto of the Grove Play, and the musical Sire composes the music. The Sire may select others to write the dialog and song lyrics, but remains responsible for the overall theme and final form of the spectacle.

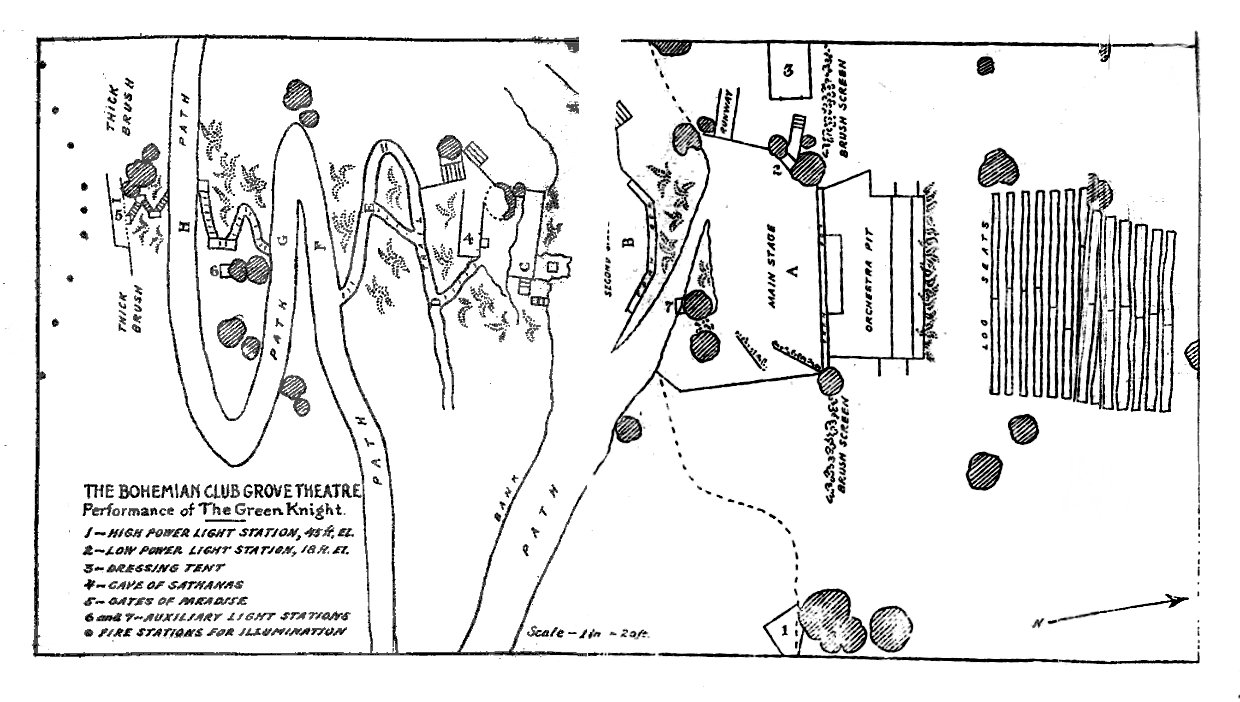
A 1911 sketch of the Grove Play stage, showing extensive upstage pathways and platforms amid the ferns and redwood trees

In the earliest productions of the Grove Play, several restrictions were imposed upon the Sire including that the stage setting be the natural forest backdrop and that the "malign character Care" be introduced in the plot, to wreak havoc with the characters and then be faced down and vanquished by the hero. In these early productions, the Cremation of Care immediately followed, and lasted until midnight. The end of the ceremony was signaled by a lively Jinks Band rendition of There'll Be a Hot Time in the Old Town Tonight, and the club members sat down to a late dinner and revelry into the wee hours.

From 1913, the Cremation of Care was disengaged from the Grove Play, and rescheduled for the first night of the summer encampment. The Grove Play was set for the final weekend. A different Sire was appointed for the Cremation, and some concerns were raised in subsequent years that the Cremation of Care was growing into its own secondary Grove Play. Some Sires experimented with a satirical treatment, or topical themes such as a patriotic World War I treatment in 1918 and an unpopular Prohibition script in 1919. "Care" was not killed, let alone cremated, in the 1922 version. In response to member complaints about the unpredictable quality of the opening night fare, Charles K. Field was asked in 1923 to write the script for what became the basis for every subsequent Cremation of Care ceremony.

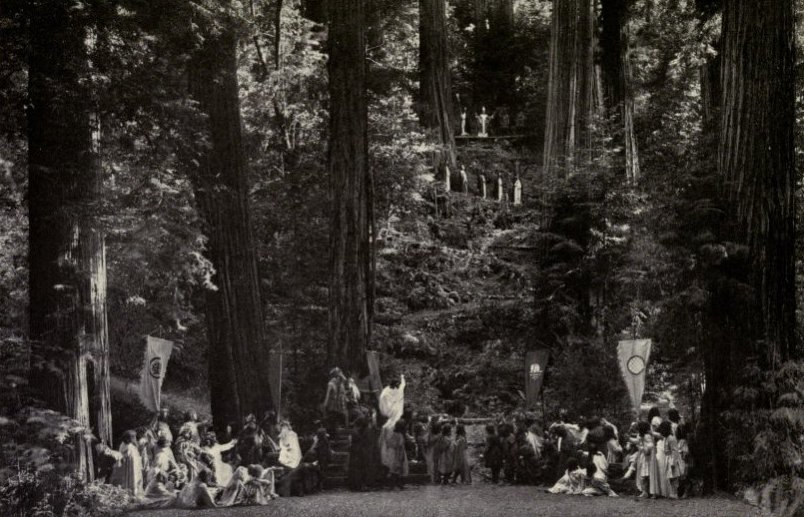
A 1909 photograph of the dress rehearsal of St. Patrick at Tara, showing the natural forest setting including switchback pathways extending the stage rearward up a hillside

From 1902 to 1923, a central theme of most Grove Plays was the mystique of the ancient Coast Redwood tree grove. Jack London wrote The Acorn Planter: A California Forest Play for the High Jinks but it was never staged; it was described as too difficult to set to music. Beginning around 1920 with the installation of a large Austin pipe organ, the productions became more professional in tone. In 1922, a sophisticated lighting system was installed at the Main Stage, the venue for the Grove Play. During the World War II years 1943–1945, no Grove Plays were staged.

Unusual performances include the 1906 production of The Owl and Care, which is listed in Grove's dictionary as "Not strictly a Grove-Play." The Triumph of Bohemia was already planned, but the 1906 San Francisco earthquake changed the club's priorities in favor of a more elaborate cremation ceremony called The Owl and Care. Two plays have been staged twice for the club members: St. Patrick at Tara in 1909 and 1934, and A Gest of Robin Hood in 1929 and 1954. 1912's The Atonement of Pan was performed once for club members and again two weeks later for members' wives and women friends. In 2008, the treatment of The Count of Monte Cristo was staged even though it had been published four years prior.

The cast for a Grove Play averages 75–100 actors, many appearing as so-called "spear carriers" in crowd scenes. Roles for female characters are played by men, since women are not allowed as members of the Bohemian Club. Including orchestra members, costumers, stage crew and carpenters, some 300 people are involved with the production each year. The cost of each play was reported in the range of $20,000–30,000 in 1975, as much as $179,000 in current value. No salaries are given to club members who take part and no admission is charged the audience. Rehearsals begin a year in advance.

Observers have characterized the Grove Plays as massive, predictable and slow. Author John van der Zee has described the Grove Plays as "lumbering pageants." Commenting on the plot, he said, "We know in advance that the hero will be a king or commander adored by his men, and that he will see his duty and do it." Journalist Philip Weiss, writing in 1989 for Spy magazine, said that the high point of the two-week summer encampment was the "vigorously lowbrow" Low Jinks, a musical comedy staged during the middle weekend, not the "mannered and ponderous Grove Play." Journalism professor Richard Reinhardt argued in 1980 that the showy bombast of Broadway theatre producer David Belasco helped form in the early Grove Plays a taste for majestic and astounding visual effects, and that this aesthetic sense has continued to the present in a form of "institutional inertia."

Year	Playwright	Title	Composer	Sire	Ref.
1902	Charles K. Field	The Man In The Forest, A Legend of the Tribe	Joseph D. Redding	Richard M. Hotaling	
1903	Louis A. Robertson	Montezuma	Humphrey J. Stewart	Louis A. Robertson	
1904	Will Irwin	The Hamadryads: A Masque of Apollo	W. J. McCoy	J. Wilson Shiels	
1905	Newton J. Tharp	The Quest of the Gorgon, A Musical Drama	Theodor Vogt	Newton J. Tharp	
1906	Charles K. Field	The Owl and Care, A Spectacle	Humphrey J. Stewart	Charles K. Field	
1907	George Sterling	The Triumph of Bohemia: A Forest Play	Edward F. Schneider	George Sterling	
1908	Herman George Scheffauer	The Sons of Baldur: A Forest Music-Drama	Arthur Weiss	Herman George Scheffauer	
1909	Harold Morse Stephens	St. Patrick at Tara	Wallace Arthur Sabin	Charles Caldwell Dobie	
1910	Charles K. Field	The Cave Man, A Play of the Redwoods	W. J. McCoy	Charles K. Field	
1911	Porter Garnett	The Green Knight, A Vision	Edward G. Stricklen	Porter Garnett	
1912	Joseph D. Redding	The Atonement of Pan, A Music-Drama	Henry Hadley	Joseph D. Redding	
1913	Rufus Steele	The Fall of Ug: A Masque of Fear	Herman Perlet	Rufus Steele	
1914	J. Wilson Shiels	Nec-Natama (Comradeship): A Forest Play	Uda Waldrop	J. Wilson Shiels	
1915	Frank Pixley	Apollo, A Music-Drama	Edward F. Schneider	Frank Pixley	
1916	Frederick S. Myrtle	Gold, A Forest Play	Humphrey J. Stewart	Frederick S. Myrtle	
1917	Charles Templeton Crocker	The Land of Happiness, A Music-Drama	Joseph D. Redding	Charles Templeton Crocker	
1918	Richard M. Hotaling and George Sterling	The Twilight of the Kings	Wallace Arthur Sabin	Richard M. Hotaling	
1919	Harry Leon Wilson	Life	Domenico Brescia		
1920	Charles Caldwell Dobie	Ilya of Murom	Ulderico Marcelli	Charles Caldwell Dobie	
1921	Clay Meredith Greene	St. John of Nepomuk	Humphrey J. Stewart		
1922	Charles Gilman Norris	The Rout of the Philistines, A Forest Play	Nino Marcelli	Charles Gilman Norris	
1923	Joseph D. Redding	Semper Virens	Henry Hadley		
1924	Roy Neily	Rajvara	Wheeler Beckett		
1925	Joseph S. Thompson	Wings	George Edwards		
1926	George Sterling	Truth, A Grove Play	Domenico Brescia		
1927	Irving Pichel	Saint Francis of Assisi	Charles Hart		
1928	Garnet Holme	Nanda	Edward F. Schneider		
1929	Charles Gilman Norris	A Gest of Robin Hood	Robert C. Newell		
1930	Waldemar Young	Birds of Rhiannon	Edward C. Harris		
1931	W. B. Garthwaite	Joan	Charles L. Safford		
1932	Daniel W. Evans	Sorcerer's Drum	Charles Hart		
1933	Junius Cravens	The Legend of Hani	Henry Hadley		
1934	Harold Morse Stephens	St. Patrick at Tara	Wallace Arthur Sabin		
1935	Wilburt Hall	The Quest	Roderick White		
1936	Charles Gilman Norris	Ivanhoe	Harry I. Wiel		
1937	Kenneth G. Hook	Lifkronan	Ulderico Marcelli		
1938	Dan Totheroh	The Piper	Eugene Heyes		
1939	Waldemar Young	The Golden Feather	Uda Waldrop		
1940	Benjamin Allen Purrington	Saul	Charles Hart		
1941	Charles Caldwell Dobie	The Golden Talisman	Alec Templeton		
1942	Carlton E. Morse; Michael Raffetto	The American Scene	Paul Carson		
1946	Dan Totheroh	Johnny Appleseed	Wendell Otey		
1947		The Yester-Years (a compilation of past Grove Play scenes)			
1948	Kenneth Ferguson	Maternus	Wendell Otey		
1949	C. B. Kelland	The Cosmic Jest	Frank R. Denke		
1950	Howard A. Muckle	Tetecan	Hugh D. Brown		
1951	Dan Totheroh	Fools in the Forest	Peter Heyes		
1952	Alexander T. Case	Tandem Triumphans	Ulderico Marcelli		
1953	Harris Allen	A Romany Legend	Antonio de Grassi		
1954	Charles Gilman Norris	A Gest of Robin Hood	Robert C. Newell		
1955	Alexander T. Case	Don Quijote, an Adventure of that Ingenious Gentlemen of La Mancha	Ulderico Marcelli		
1956	Gordon Steedman Philip Boone	The Beggar	Hugh D. Brown		
1957	Bauer E. Kramer	Diablo	Frank R. Denke	Kendric B. Morrish	
1958	Earle C. Anthony	Aloha Oe	Ulderico Marcelli	Carey Wilson	
1959	Howard A. Muckle	Cortez	Hugh D. Brown		
1960	Dan Totheroh	Rip Van Winkle	Charles Hart	Dan Totheroh	
1961	Alexander T. Case	A Soldier and Mr. Lincoln	Ulderico Marcelli	Charles F. Bulotti, Jr.	
1962	True Tourtillot	Agincourt	Robert B. England	Alexander S. McDill	
1963	Richard L. Breen	The Green Mountain Boys	Raymond W. Hackett		
1964	David Bickersteth Magee	The Buccaneers: a Grove Play based on Robert Louis Stevenson's Treasure Island	Leon C. Radsliff	David Bickersteth Magee	
1965	Alexander T. Case	Sancho Panza	Leigh Harline	Thomas J. Tyrrell	
1966	Ralph Moody	The Valley of the Moon	Raymond W. Hackett	J. Fenton McKenna	
1967	John Brent Mills	Will	Wendell Otey		
1968	Harry Anderson	Omar	Charles G. Dant		
1969	Neill Compton Wilson	St. John of Bohemia	Leigh Harline	Neill Compton Wilson	
1970	David Bickersteth Magee	The Bonny Cravat	George Shearing		
1971	Francis Xavier Fogarty	Red is the Grass	Francis Xavier Fogarty		
1972	Robert B. England	The Centennial Grove Play, (1872–1972)	Charles G. Dant		
1973	David Bickersteth Magee	The Golden Cave	George Shearing		
1974	John Brent Mills	Armada	Dale Wood	John Brent Mills	
1975	Will A. Parker	Allegory: An Odyssey in Time and Space	Carl J. Eberhard		
1976	Robert B. England	Noah	Frank R. Denke		
1977	Louis E. Felder	El Dorado	Louis F. Bush		
1978	Alan Hammond Nichols	Siddhartha	Earl Zindars		
1979	Alexander T. Case	The Flying Spear	Charles G. Dant		
1980	Peter R. Arnott	Olympus	Carl J. Eberhard		
1981	Francis N. Marshall	Taj Mahal			
1982	Irving Pichel	Saint Francis of Assisi	Charles Hart		
1983	James L. Benington	Ciao Venezia	Carl J. Eberhard	Bradford W. Young	
1984	Donald L. Winks	Maximilian!	Jack Rogers		
1985	George S. Prugh	Solferino	Parmer Fuller	Robert B. England	
1986	Rod McManigal	Galileo	Carl J. Eberhard	William W. Schwarzer	
1987	John Brent Mills	Talleyrand			
1988	Howard Guy Ervin	Robert the Bruce	William P. Snyder		
1989	Rod McManigal	Pompeii	David A. Bowman	John M. Blauer	
1990	J. Thomas Rosch	The Prophecy	William Whitney Pursell		
1991	Donald L. Winks	Tyburn Fair	Richard B. Evans		
1992	Nello Pace	Cristoforo Columbo	Jack Rogers		
1993	Sonny Bing Gee	Qin Shihuang-Di; The First Emperor	Herbert A. Goodrich		
1994	Mac McCandless	The Leonardo Betrayal	Kenneth B. Baggott		
1995	Rod McManigal	Marco Polo	Jack Rogers		
1996	John Brent Mills	Runnymede	Allyn Ferguson		
1997	Donald L. Winks	Time and Again: A Compendium of Highlights from Grove Plays over the Years	Charles M. Denton		
1998	Charles L. Morey	Alexandre Dumas and His Musketeers	E. R. McCandless		
1999	Richard C. Dehmel	Merlin	Herbert A. Goodrich		
2000	James C. Crimmins	Je suis Lafitte	Allyn Ferguson		
2001	Kenneth B. Baggott	Marius of the Populares			
2002	Howard Guy Ervin III	Emperor Norton	Richard Walsh	Edward W. Pliska	
2003	Peter O'Malley	Fort Ross	Peter R. Arnott		
2004	Paul Downey	Concord Fight	Nolan Gasser		
2005	Richard C. Dehmel	Bully!	Jeffrey Haskell		
2006	Will A. Parker	Allegory	Carl J. Eberhard	Peter Arnott	
2007	Mark W. Cleary	Leprechaun	Richard B. Evans	Peter Devine	
2008	Charles L. Morey	The Count of Monte Cristo			
2009	David Pettus	Gaijin	Greg Pliska	Charles Siebert	
2010	Kenneth B. Baggott	Atlantis	Brett Strader	Hunt Burdick	
2011	Howard Guy Ervin III	Casanova	Richard B. Evans	Peter Devine	
2012	Herbert Goodrich	Tchaikovsky's Masque	Shinji Eshima	Kenneth Baggott	
2013	William Bentley	Longbow	Brett Strader	Hunt Burdick	
2014	Kenneth Baggot	Rama	Brett Strader	W. Blake Winchell	
2015	Howard Guy Irvin III	Kidnapped	Richard B. Evans	Charles Siebert	
2016	Charles L. Morey	The Booth brothers			
2017	Dick Christie	The shores of Tripoli			
2018	W. Blake Winchell	Remember			
2019	Kenneth Baggott	Grendl			
2020	none	canceled due to the COVID-19 pandemic.			
