= The Purple Highway =

1923 film by Henry Kolker

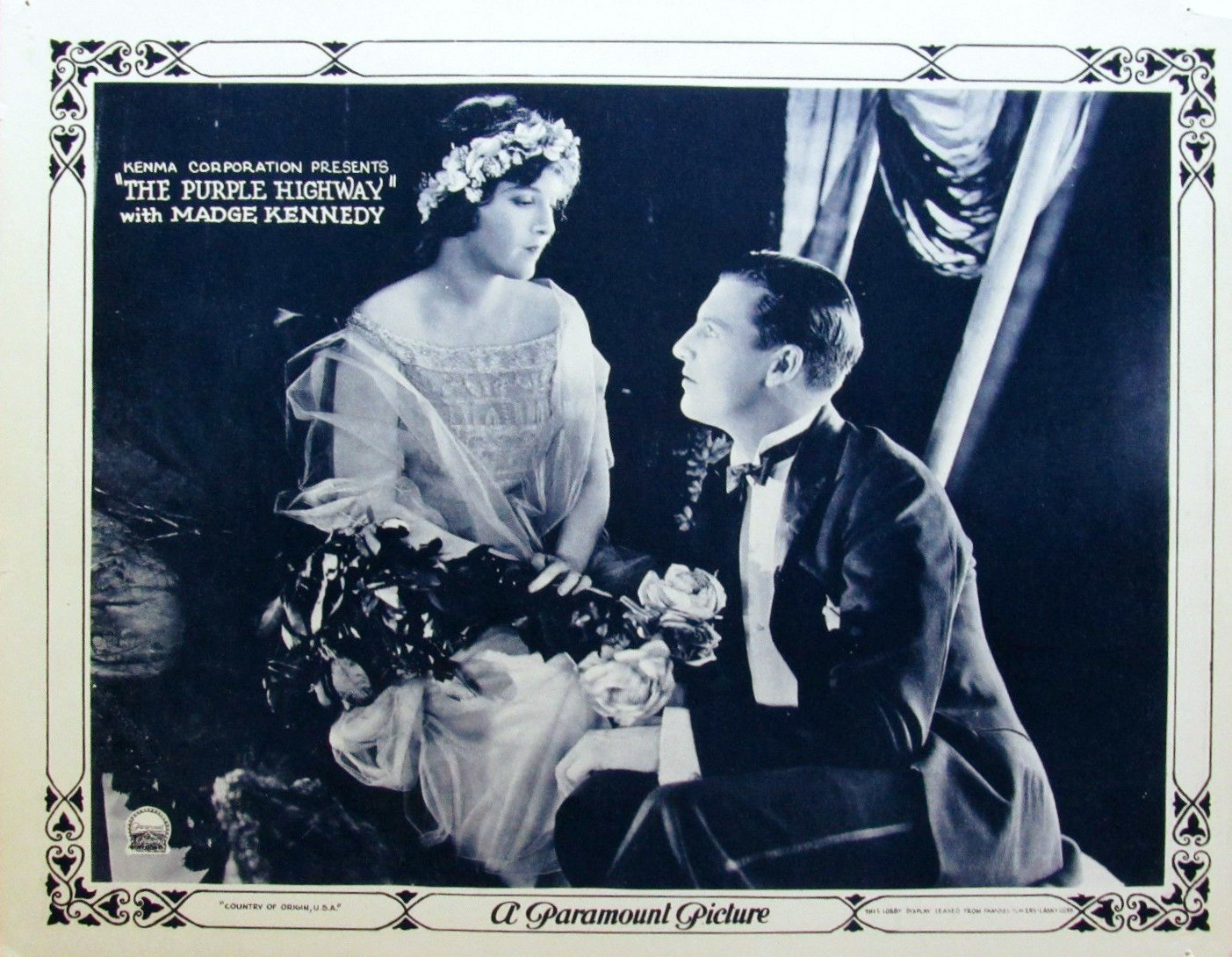
- Lobby card
- Directed by: Henry Kolker
- Written by: Rufus Steele (adaptation)
- Based on: Dear Me by Hale Hamilton and Luther Reed
- Produced by: Kenma
- Starring: Madge Kennedy; Monte Blue
- Cinematography: Henry Cronjager; George Webber
- Distributed by: Paramount Pictures
- Release date: August 5, 1923
- Running time: 70 minutes
- Country: United States
- Language: Silent (English intertitles)

The Purple Highway is a lost 1923 American silent comedy-drama film directed by Henry Kolker and starring Madge Kennedy. It was released by Paramount Pictures. The film is based on a 1921 Broadway play, Dear Me, by Hale Hamilton and Luther Reed. Hamilton's wife Grace La Rue starred in the play version.

== Cast ==
- Madge Kennedy as April Blair
- Monte Blue as Edgar Prentice aka Edgar Craig
- Vincent Coleman as Dudley Quail
- Pedro de Cordoba as Joe Renard
- Dore Davidson as Manny Bean
- Emily Fitzroy as Mrs. Carney
- William H. Tooker as Mr. Quail
- Winifred Harris as Mrs. Quail
- John W. Jenkins as Shakespeare Jones
- Charles Kent as Mr. Ogilvie
