= The Inner Chamber =

1921 film

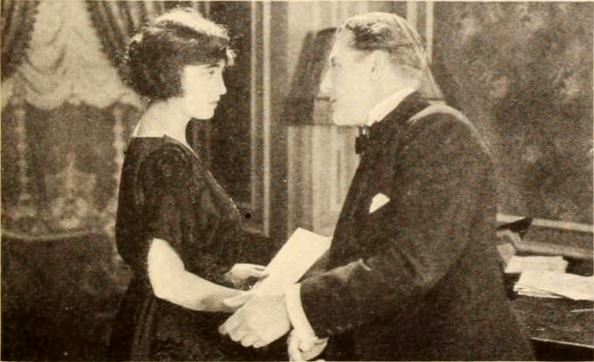
- Film still
- Directed by: Edward José
- Written by: C. Graham Baker
- Based on: The Blood Red Dawn by Charles Caldwell Dobie
- Produced by: Wilbert Mellville
- Starring: Alice Joyce
- Distributed by: Vitagraph Company of America
- Release date: September 11, 1921 (United States)
- Running time: 60 minutes
- Country: United States
- Language: Silent (English intertitles)

The Inner Chamber is a 1921 American silent romantic drama film produced and distributed by the Vitagraph Company of America. It was based on the novel The Blood Red Dawn by Charles Caldwell Dobie. The film was directed by Edward José and starred Alice Joyce. The film is now considered lost.

== Cast ==
- Alice Joyce as Claire Robson
- Jane Jennings as Mrs. Robson
- Pedro de Cordoba as Dr. George Danilo
- Holmes Herbert as Edward J. Wellman
- John Webb Dillon as Sawyer Flint
- Grace Barton as Mrs. Sawyer Flint
- Ida Waterman as Mrs. Finch-Brown
- Josephine Whittell as Nellie McGuire
- Hedda Hopper as Mrs. Candor (credited as Mrs. De Wolf Hopper)

== Reception ==
On November 23, 1921, The Belmont Citizen, a newspaper in Belmont, Massachusetts, reviewed the movie in their column "On Stage and Screen" when it played at The Belmont-Waverley Strand Theater on Trapelo Road. Under the headline "Alice Joyce to be seen in 'The Inner Chamber,'" it read:

"Alice Joyce, the star of 'The Inner Chamber,' is kind-hearted and always ready to lend a helping hand. In one of the early scenes of the production, which will be shown at the Belmont-Waverley Strand theater on Monday and Tuesday, November 28 and 29, she poses as a stenographer, and from her scanty earnings buys her mother some fruit. Before the scene is made, the star stopped at a nearby fruit store and purchased some pears. While she was in the store, a little street urchin stopped before a window and looked longingly at the display. Miss Joyce emerged with her purchases and, spying the little lad, offered him a pear. A smile lit up his countenance as he thanked her. She walked gayley away.

"The story of 'The Inner Chamber' deals with the adventures of a stenographer whose employer spreads a malicious falsehood about her. The girl is engaged in supporting her mother, an invalid, and has a difficult time obtaining positions. The lie follows her from place to place, and she finds herself constantly out of employment. The only one who befriends her is torn from her by another falsehood, and to escape further trouble she marries a Greek doctor. The doctor is very jealous and kills himself in an insane fit of jealousy. The heroine learns the truth in regard to her only friend, and they are reunited with the prospect of being happily married.

"Many costly sets are required for the production, which is unusual in every respect. It is based upon Charles Caldwell Dobie's famous novel 'The Blood Red Dawn.'"
