= Zoo in Budapest =

1933 film by Rowland V. Lee

- Directed by: Rowland V. Lee
- Written by: Melville Baker; Jack Kirkland (story); Dan Totheroh; Louise Long; Rowland V. Lee (screenplay)
- Produced by: Jesse L. Lasky
- Starring: Loretta Young; Gene Raymond; O.P. Heggie; Dorothy Libaire
- Cinematography: Lee Garmes
- Edited by: Harold D. Schuster
- Music by: R.H. Bassett; Peter Brunelli; Louis De Francesco; Hugo Friedhofer; Werner Janssen; J.S. Zamecnik (all uncredited)
- Production company: Fox Film Corporation
- Distributed by: Fox Film Corporation
- Release date: April 28, 1933
- Running time: 94 minutes
- Country: United States
- Language: English

Zoo in Budapest is a 1933 American pre-Code romantic drama film directed by Rowland V. Lee and starring Loretta Young, Gene Raymond, O.P. Heggie, and Paul Fix. Gene Raymond, portrays Zani, a young, mischievous man who has grown up exclusively around the animals and the people who work and visit the zoo. Loretta Young plays Eve, an orphan who wants to escape her situation and live in the real world. O.P. Heggie plays Dr. Grunbaum, the zoo doctor, who is a father-like figure to Zani. The original 35mm prints of the film contained sequences tinted in amber or blue.

Produced by Jesse L. Lasky. Written by Melville Baker, Jack Kirkland, Dan Totheroh, Louise Long, and screenplay by Rowland V. Lee. With Oscar winning cinematographer Lee Garmes.

== Plot ==
Flamboyant Zani is a kind young man who works and grew up entirely in the zoo in Budapest, Hungary. Zani has been chastised by his boss for being too nice to the zoo’s animals whom he views as his only real friends. Zani’s mother died in childbirth. His father, one of the best caretakers of the animals, died early in Zani's life, leaving the boy to be raised alongside the zoo animals. The other main character is Eve, a young and beautiful orphan girl. Eve, faced with the prospect of being forced to work as an indentured servant (more like a slave) now that she is eighteen, plans to somehow escape from her strict orphanage.

At the film’s beginning viewers meet and see a lot of the different animals living at the zoo and how various people react to them. A little boy named Paul is introduced. Paul is accompanied by his harsh governess at the zoo. He wants to interact more with the animals but his governess never gets him much opportunity to do so. After meandering about the zoo, we come to Dr. Grunbaum’s office, where he is examining a sick monkey. A woman enters the office and says that her skunk fur has been stolen. Apparently hers is not the first to go missing. She threatens to ruin the place if her fur is not found. Dr. Grunbaum sends for Zani, and while officials escort him through the grounds he spots the orphan girls who’ve come to visit the zoo. The girls are all whispering to each other that Zani is there. Zani makes it back to the doctor’s office where the two men end up bonding after reminiscing about Zani’s father. Zani admits that he stole the furs. Dr. Grunbaum starts to punish him, but he cannot bring himself to do so because as Zani has headed out the door, the orphan girls walk by. Dr. Grunbaum assures the officer that Zani will not step out of line again.

As Zani gets closer to the girls he lets out a whistle tune and the girls automatically recognize its his. The girls move along to look at the ostriches, as the head of the orphanage reads a factual booklet to them. As the girls are walking, they tell Eve that if she wants to escape now would be the ideal time. However, one girl that strictly advises her against it and warns her what could happen if she gets caught running away. Since Eve just turned eighteen on the previous day and is due to be turned over to be an indentured servant, this might be her only chance to leave. The orphanage group keep walking around the zoo, eventually coming to the lion enclosure where Zani stands between them and the cage. Zani starts talking to the lion, but his speech is directed at Eve. He tells the lion to think of all the fun he could have if he were free, and that you just have to take that chance. After Maeve misses her first chance to escape, the other girls send a signal to a girl at the front by each touching the arm of the one in front of her. Upon receiving the signal, the girl jumps over the railing and into a pond, giving Eve the distraction she needs to escape. The girls near Eve give her different clothes, and she runs off into the bushes.

After all of this, Zani overhears a couple talking about wanting to buy the fox at the zoo so the wife can turn it into a muff. This angers Zani greatly and the first chance he gets shortly afterwards he steals the woman's fur. The woman and the man go to the office to report her fur stolen, and immediately the officers and the doctor know the culprit.

Meanwhile, Paul, the little boy with his governess, runs away while boarding the bus to leave when his governess is distracted. Next seen is the head of the orphanage who, after counting her students, realizes that one is one missing, and that one would be Eve. We return to the governess who discovers that her charges, Paul, is missing, and she alerts an officer to look for him. The boy runs back into the zoo another way, while the officers close up the gates. However, the head of the Orphanage informs them that there is still someone in there that is lost, but they assure her that everyone is out. She tells the officers that if they do find anyone in there to come get her immediately so she can grab Eve herself.

Regarding the stolen fur, Dr. Grunbaum realizes that he has no choice but to turn Zani into the law enforcement officials. But Zani offers to help them search for Eve. He eventually finds her in the bushes, but informs the officer that there is no one there, so he will leave. Eve changes out of her uniform into regular street clothes. After leading the officer astray, Zani goes back to Eve and both declare that they have cared for each other this entire time and the whistles were to let the other know they were near. They sit for a while talking and eventually they kiss before heading out, taking a little-known route Zani knows so they won’t be caught. Zani takes Eve to an old bear den, that has a hole in it where you can look and see a view of the city. Zani leaves Eve alone to find food for her, as the officers all gather at the zoo to search for either Zani, Paul, or Eve. Not being able to resist, Zani enters the hospital and immediately jumps into action to help Dr. Grunbaum save the sick monkey. He comes up with the solution of bringing in Maria, the other monkey in the sick monkey’s cage. Zani’s idea saves the animal, and Dr. Grunbaum temporarily forgets that he is having Zani arrested.

On Zani's way back to the den he picks up Mimi the monkey and takes her with him. When he gets there he finds that Eve is upset, wondering what is going to happen to them tomorrow. Zani tries his best to comfort her. Meanwhile Paul's parents are worried and want to know where their son is, and more police officers have arrived to look for the three missing people. Back at the den, it is revealed that Eve ran away for Zani and that Zani wanted her to run away for him. Eve says she thought they'd get married. Her declaration initially shocks Zani, but realizing his reaction has hurt Eve he asks her what they would do if that happens. She says that they would get a house somewhere just like others. After a moment of happiness, Eve find Paul hiding and crying near the den, because he thinks he is going to jail, because he’s run away.

One of the other zookeepers finds the three in the den. Zani and Paul escape, but shortly after he starts running away from the officers, Zani gets caught. The other zookeeper is trying to have his way with Eve now that Zani is gone, but Zani hears Eve's screams and escapes to save her. He fights the other zookeeper off Eve. Paul keeps running until he gets to an area where there is a strange man locked in a cage. He was put earlier that night by one of the zookeepers. The strange man has Paul go and get the key and get him out of the cage but Paul accidentally unlocks the wrong cage and lets the tiger loose. All of a sudden the tiger leaps around exciting all of the other animals, who break out of their cages and begin fighting with one another. This makes the little boy start to sob, when someone hears him and they recognize it coming from the tiger, lion, and elephant area.

In a resourceful move, Zani lowers himself to where Paul is so he can snatch him up and get him out of harms way. However one of the animals grabs hold of Zani's leg and he is gravely injured. After getting the help of some horses and a very smart elephant the doctor gets the animals back into their cages. As Zani is getting taken away to the hospital, Paul's father comes up to thank him, and ask there if is anything he can do to help Zani. Zani replies that he does not want the orphanage to send Eve away.

You fast forward a little bit and Paul's father, Mr. Vandor, is at the orphanage arranging with its head for Eve to be under his protection for the next five years. Regardless, the issue of guardianship is not going to matter because Eve is to marry Zani the next day, and they will live on the Vandor’s estate where Zani will look after the animals. The last shot is of Eve and Zani riding a horse and saying that they are home and just like the other people.

== Cast ==
- Loretta Young as Eve
- Gene Raymond as Zani
- O.P. Heggie as Dr. Grunbaum
- Wally Albright as Paul Vandor
- Paul Fix as Heinie
- Murray Kinnell as Garbosh
- Ruth Warren as Katrina
- Roy Stewart as Karl
- Frances Rich as Elsie
- Niles Welch as Mr. Vandor
- Lucille Ward as Miss Murst
- Russ Powell as Toski
- Dorothy Libaire as Rosita

== Reception ==
The film received good reviews almost all around when it premiered in 1933, with Rush from Variety saying it has "extreme beauty in its physical production and good action that will carry interest to the generality." While Denis from Billboard says that "this picture ought to please easily and should have no trouble in the box office."

Along with the cinematography, the romantic story was very well received, with Broadway and Hollywood Movies saying, "The story teems with action, interludes of pathos and exquisitely beautiful romance."
