= Deep Valley =

1947 film by Jean Negulesco

- Theatrical release poster
- Directed by: Jean Negulesco
- Screenplay by: Stephen Morehouse Avery; Salka Viertel
- Based on: the novel Deep Valley by Dan Totheroh
- Produced by: Henry Blanke
- Starring: Ida Lupino; Dane Clark; Wayne Morris
- Cinematography: Ted McCord
- Edited by: Owen Marks
- Music by: Max Steiner
- Production company: Warner Bros. Pictures
- Distributed by: Warner Bros. Pictures
- Release date: August 22, 1947 (New York City)
- Running time: 104 minutes
- Country: United States
- Language: English
- Box office: $1.4 million (US)

Deep Valley is a 1947 American drama film directed by Jean Negulesco and starring Ida Lupino, Dane Clark and Wayne Morris. It was produced and released by Warner Bros. Pictures. A young woman lives unhappily with her embittered parents in an isolated rural home until an escaped convict changes her dreary existence. It was based on the novel of the same name by Dan Totheroh.

== Plot ==
A young woman, Libby Saul, lives with her parents on an isolated farm not far from the California coast. Libby is used by her parents as a middle-man because they no longer speak to each other directly. She has developed a stammer over the years. One day when she is out wandering, she bumps into a group of convicts building a road along the coastline. She returns for several days, without her parents knowing, to watch them from a distance. She is particularly interested in Barry Burnette, a handsome young convict.

Eventually the convicts work their way through the hill that stands between them and Libby's parents' farm. They approach the farm in search of fresh water. Mr. Saul, Libby's father, offers to sell them water from his well, but they turn him down. He decides to give them water for free instead.

The foreman taunts Burnette to the point where he punches his boss. One of the young men working with the convicts, Jeff Barker, is an engineer, who is fresh out of the Army. Mr. Saul invites Barker to the farm for dinner one night. Mrs. Saul hopes he will take an interest in her daughter and ultimately want to marry her. Libby and Barker talk, but because Libby is very interested in Burnette, she asks the engineer what is going to happen to him. He replies that Burnette will be sent back to San Quentin for the attack on the foreman.

Barker asks Libby to come dancing with him, but she is too shy to accept his invitation. Mr. Saul is disappointed in his daughter's reluctance, and after Barker leaves, he slaps Libby in the face. This is the last straw; Libby tells her parents that she will not live like that anymore, and she runs away from home that very night.

With Libby gone, Mrs. Saul is forced to get up from her bed and go downstairs to communicate with her husband for the first time in many years. Libby and her beloved dog Joe stay in a nearby cabin. Not long after, during a heavy rainstorm, Burnette joins her. He escaped from the prison transport. Libby offers to help him get away. Burnette tells Libby of the reason for his imprisonment: He was arrested for fighting while he was in the Navy. Later he committed a robbery while he was drunk, and a man was accidentally killed. He was sent to San Quentin for manslaughter.

Libby and Burnette plan to elope to San Francisco together, but she has to return to the farm to get some clothes and supplies on the way. When she goes home, she finds, to her surprise, that her parents have reconciled. They tell her that there is a posse out looking for Burnette. The posse arrives at the farm while Libby is there, so she cannot return to Burnette. When Burnette does not hear from her, he comes to the farm late at night, looking for her. She hides him in the barn, and there, in the night, Libby and Burnette fall hopelessly in love with each other. Later, Burnette is nearly discovered by Barker, who is part of the posse, when he goes out to find a tire pump. Libby intercepts him and saves Burnette at the last second.

Because of Libby's strange behavior, Mrs. Saul begins to suspect that something is wrong and eventually confronts the couple. Burnette and Libby run off just as Mr. Saul and Barker come to take Burnett. When Barker tries to stop them, Burnette knocks him down and drives off in the truck, leaving Libby behind. The rest of the posse pursues Burnette. He is shot and dies in Libby's arms, after telling her he just needed to know someone who knew he didn't mean to kill that man.

== Cast ==
- Ida Lupino as Libby Saul
- Dane Clark as Barry Burnette
- Wayne Morris as Jeff Barker
- Fay Bainter as Ellie Saul
- Henry Hull as Cliff Saul
- Willard Robertson as Sheriff Akers
- Rory Mallinson as Foreman
- Jack Mower as Supervisor
- John Alvin as Convict

== Production ==
The film was shot in Big Bear Lake, California.

== Reception ==
The New York Times praised the actors but criticized the plot: “It's just a highly incredible...attempt at tempestuous drama. But the film is very well acted...With a more credibly defined story to support the performances, Deep Valley might easily have become an arresting picture.”

Film critic Dennis Schwartz generally likes the film. He wrote: "A slow paced, b&w, atmospheric melodrama, set in the mountains of northern California, about a farm girl, Libby Saul (Ida Lupino), romanced by an escaped convict, Barry Burnette (Dane Clark)...The interesting part of the film revolves around the conflict Libby faces of running away with the violent fugitive she has fallen madly in love with or to have a secure marriage with the really nice engineer, someone she doesn't love. Deep Valley offers a melodramatic look at how love can make one feel alive again. The film comes to a boil with its very moving conclusion, after a very slow start."
