= Rule G (film) =

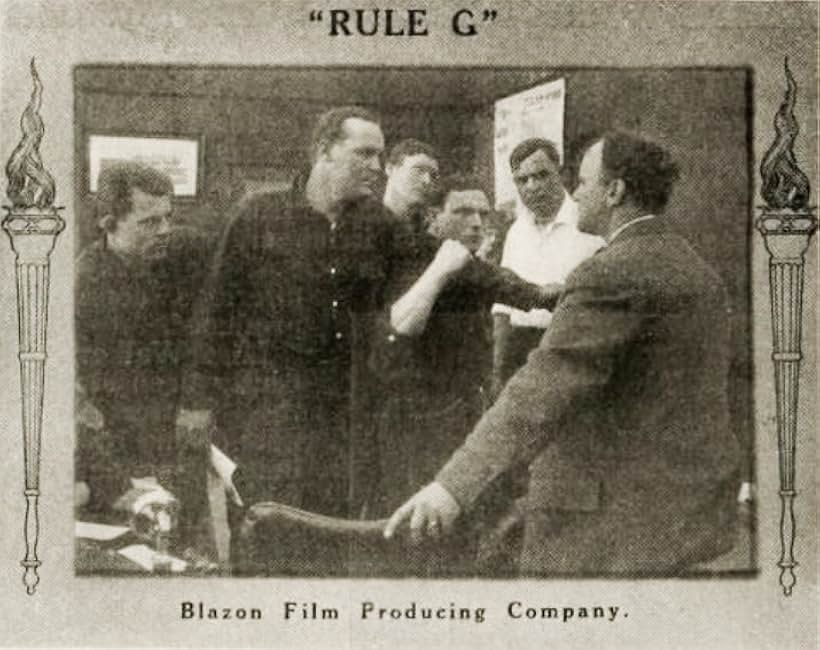
- Directed by: George W. Lawrence; G.M. Noble
- Written by: Rufus Steele
- Starring: Harry L. Stevenson; Lawrence Katzenberg; A.C. Posey; Paul Gillette; Jack O'Connor; Kathleen Emerson
- Cinematography: George W. Lawrence
- Production company: Blazon Film Producing Company
- Distributed by: Paramount Pictures
- Release date: March 4, 1915
- Country: United States
- Language: English

Rule G is a 1915 American comedy silent film directed by George W. Lawrence and G.M. Noble and written by Rufus Steele. The film stars Harry L. Stevenson, Lawrence Katzenberg, A.C. Posey, Paul Gillette, Jack O'Connor and Kathleen Emerson. The film was released on March 4, 1915, by Paramount Pictures.

== Cast ==
- Harry L. Stevenson as Sandy Weston
- Lawrence Katzenberg as Spike Lacey
- A.C. Posey as Ned Douglas
- Paul Gillette as Neil Atterbury
- Jack O'Connor as Silent Smith
- Kathleen Emerson as Myra Weston
