= Two Alone =

1934 film by Elliott Nugent

- Directed by: Elliott Nugent
- Written by: Josephine Lovett; Joseph Moncure March
- Based on: Wild Birds by Dan Totheroh
- Produced by: Merian C. Cooper
- Starring: Tom Brown; Jean Parker; ZaSu Pitts
- Cinematography: Lucien N. Andriot
- Edited by: Arthur Roberts
- Music by: Max Steiner
- Production company: RKO Radio Pictures
- Distributed by: RKO Radio Pictures
- Release date: January 26, 1934
- Running time: 75 minutes
- Country: United States
- Language: English
- Budget: $236,000
- Box office: $134,000

Two Alone is a 1934 American pre-Code drama film directed by Elliott Nugent and starring Tom Brown and Jean Parker. According to RKO records the film lost $158,000. Based on the play Wild Birds by Dan Totheroh, most remember the film primarily for its early skinny-dipping scene. Jean Parker was borrowed from MGM.

== Plot ==
Bighearted farm girl Mazie befriends reform-school runaway Adam, but this leads to trouble for them both. Taking advantage of his daughter's new pal, Mazie's evil foster father, Slag, puts Adam to work and doesn't pay him, telling him he'll be sent back to the reformatory if he complains. Mazie and Adam soon fall in love, and they hatch a plan to flee from the increasingly creepy Slag. But their journey will be full of challenges and surprises.

== Cast ==
- Jean Parker as Mazie
- Tom Brown as Adam Morrison
- Zasu Pitts as Esthey Roberts
- Arthur Byron as Slag
- Beulah Bondi as Mrs. Slag
- Nydia Westman as Corie Slag
- Willard Robertson as George Marshall
- Charley Grapewin as Sandy Roberts
- Emerson Treacy as Milt Pollard
- Paul Nicholson as The Sheriff

== Production ==
According to producer David Lewis, Merian Cooper, head of RKO, approached him asking for a vehicle for his new wife, Dorothy Jordan. Lewis suggested the play Wild Birds and Cooper agreed to buy it. Jo Lovett wrote the first script whose dialogue was worked on by Joseph March. Filming began but Cooper had a heart attack and Jordan had to leave the film to be with him. Cooper was replaced as head of RKO by Pandro Berman, who suggested Jordan be replaced by Jean Parker from MGM.

== Censorship ==
Before the film could be released in Kansas, the Kansas Board of Review required the elimination of the nude woman sitting on a rock until she swims away.

== Reception ==
Lewis later wrote "Ultimately I was not happy with the film; it didn’t jell at all. The poetry of the play disappeared and the films eemed to me leaden. Maybe the material just wasn’t film material. I had been so highly enthusiastic about the property, I probably didn’t have the perception at that time to examine the screenplay and discover its faults....Jean Parker was no better a choice for the role of the girl than Dorothy Jordan....You could say it was aimed for art-house audiences, but at that time they didn’t exist. Two Alone had been calculated to give RKO a little class, but I doubt that it did." it.

== See also ==
- List of American films of 1934

== Notes ==
- Lewis, David (1993). Curtis, James (ed.). The Creative Producer. Metuchen: Scarecrow Press. ISBN 0-8108-2720-4.
