= Charles Gilman Norris =

American novelist

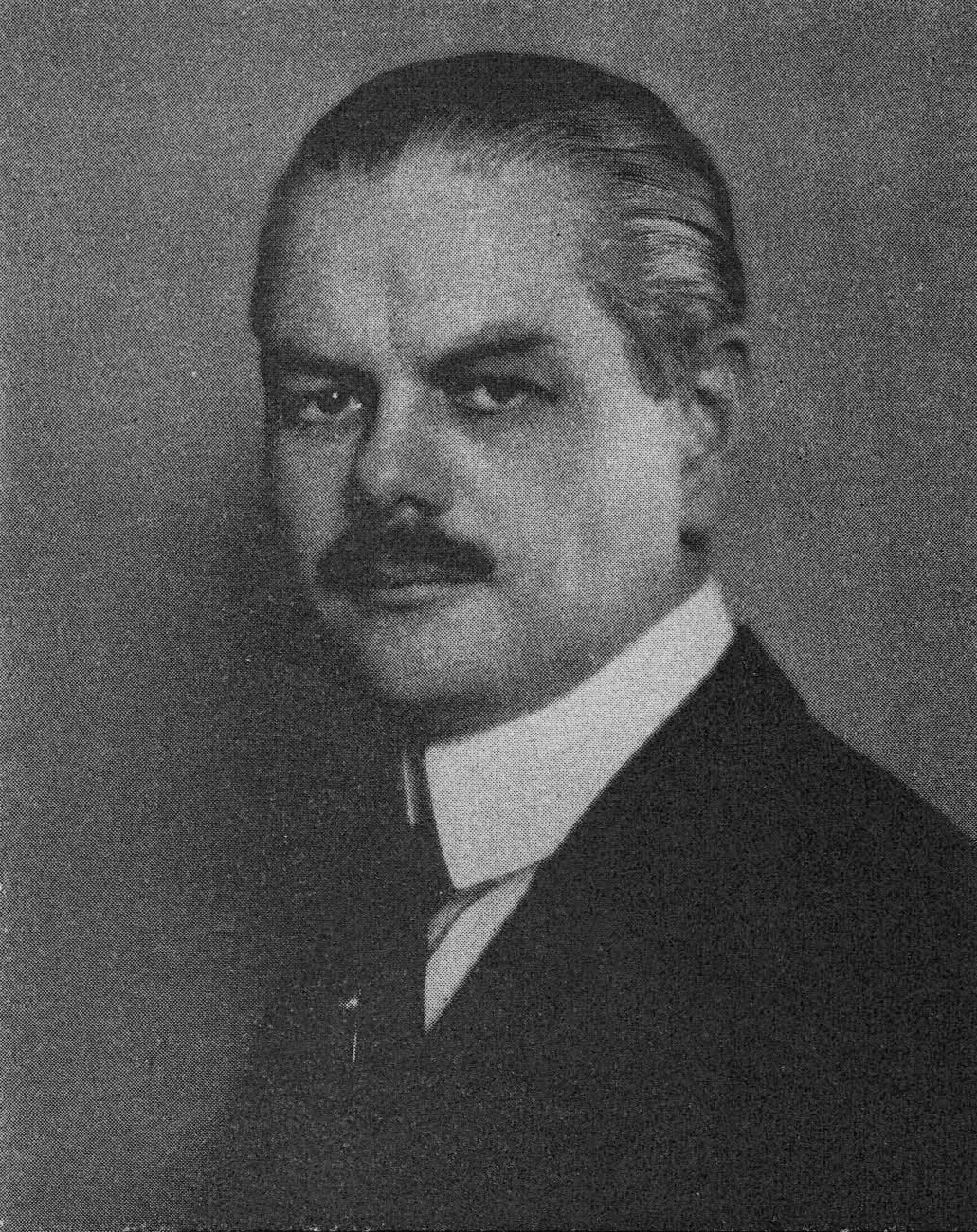
- Charles G. Norris, circa 1922
- Born: April 23, 1881
- Died: July 25, 1945 (aged 64)
- Occupation: Novelist

Charles Gilman Norris (April 23, 1881 – July 25, 1945) was an American novelist. A native of Chicago, Norris worked as a journalist for some years before finding success as a novelist and playwright. His first book was The Amateur (1916). His other novels include Salt (1919), Brass: A Novel of Marriage (1921), Bread (1923), Pig Iron (1926), Seed: A Novel of Birth Control (1930), Zest (1933), Hands (1935), and Flint (1944). He also published three plays: The Rout of the Philistines (with Nino Marcelli, 1922), A Gest of Robin Hood (with Robert C. Newell, 1929), and Ivanhoe: A Grove Play (1936).

== Critiques of his work ==
Norris was well-respected by his literary peers. In a letter to Alida Bigelow dated September 23, 1919, F. Scott Fitzgerald advised the young woman to "read "Salt" young girl so that you may know what life B." (spelling is that of Fitzgerald). The Oxford Companion to American Literature notes that Norris' novels dealt with "such problems as modern education, women in business, hereditary and environmental influences, big business, ethics and birth control."

== Family ==
He was the brother of novelist Frank Norris and the husband of author Kathleen Norris. His granddaughter Kathleen Norris (1 Mar. 1935, San Francisco–8 Dec. 1967, San Francisco) was married to Prince Andrew Romanoff (1923–2021).

== Novels and short stories ==
- The Amateur. New York: George H. Doran, 1916. at Google Books
- Salt; or, The Education of Griffith Adams. N. Y.: E.P. Dutton and Company, 1919. at Google Books
- Brass; A Novel of Marriage. N.Y.: E. P. Dutton, 1921. at Google Books
- Marriage; Short Stories of Married life by American Writers, Tarkington, Cutting, Hergesheimer, Miller, Street, Delano, Norris, Gale, Harrison, Kelland, Hopper, Adams, Butler, Foster, Hughes, Dreiser, Cooper, Turner, Webster, Lincoln. Garden City, N. Y.,: Doubleday Page, 1923.
- Bread. N.Y: Dutton, 1923.
- Pig Iron. N.Y: E. P. Dutton, 1926.
- Zelda Marsh. N.Y.: E.P. Dutton, 1927.
- Seed, A Novel of Birth Control. Garden City, N.Y.,: Doubleday Doran, 1930.
- Zest. Garden City, N. Y.: Doubleday Doran, 1933.
- Hands. New York,: Farrar & Rinehart, 1935.
- Bricks Without Straw. N.Y.: Doubleday Doran, 1938.
- Flint. Garden City, New York.: Doubleday Doran, 1944.

Books by Charles Norris in Theodore Dreiser's library

- John Rossiter's Wife

== Plays ==
- The Rout of the Philistines : A Forest Play. San Francisco, Calif.: Bohemian Club, 1922. at Google Books
- Norris, Charles Gilman, Robert C. Newell, and Bohemian Club. A Gest of Robin Hood. San Francisco,: Bohemian Club, 1929.
- Norris, Charles Gilman, Walter Scott, and Calif. Bohemian Club (San Francisco). Ivanhoe: A Grove Play. San Francisco: Bohemian Club, 1936.

== Works on Frank Norris ==
- Norris, Frank. A Deal in Wheat, and Other Stories of the New and Old West. New York,: Doubleday Page, 1903.
- Norris, Frank, and Charles Gilman Norris (introd.). The Octopus : A Story of California. Garden City, N. Y.: Doubleday Page & Co., 1924.
- Norris, Frank, and Charles Gilman Norris. The Third Circle. New York,: J. Lane Company, 1909.
- Norris, Charles Gilman. Frank Norris, 1870–1902; An Intimate Sketch of the Man who was Universally Acclaimed the Greatest American Writer of His Generation. New York,: Doubleday Page, 1914.
- Norris, Frank, Oscar Lewis, and Charles Gilman Norris. Frank Norris of "the Wave": Stories & Sketches from the San Francisco Weekly, 1893 to 1897. San Francisco,: The Westgate Press, 1931.
