= Audrey Call =

American violinist and composer

- Audrey Call Marcelli
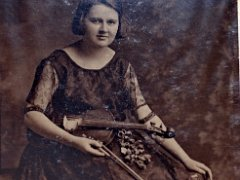
- Audrey Call, ca. 1925
- Born: April 12, 1905; Alton, Indiana
- Died: June 3, 2001; Santa Rosa, California
- Education: Sherwood Music School (Chicago), Conservatoire National de Musique et de Declamation (Paris)
- Known for: Soloist and composer for numerous radio shows in the 1930s, including "Halls of Ivy" and "Fibber McGee and Molly"
- Notable work: "the Witch of Harlem", "Canterbury Tales"
- Style: jazz violin
- Spouse: Ulderico Marcelli

Audrey Call (1905–2001) was an American violinist and composer, writing for and soloing with studio orchestras for NBC and CBS in New York, Chicago, and Hollywood. One of very few women composers writing in a jazz style for the violin, she performed on the "Fibber McGee and Molly", "Dennis Day", "Imogene Coca", and Ronald Colman's Halls of Ivy radio shows.

== Biography ==
Audrey Call was born in Alton, Indiana, in 1905, and began playing the violin at an early age. She studied under Chicago composer and concertmaster P. Marinus Paulson at Sherwood Music School. She won a number of important competitions, one of which led to her performing the Paganini Violin Concerto in Chicago. She then was awarded a scholarship to study in France at the Conservatoire Nationale de Musique et de Declamation in Paris, now known as the Conservatoire de Paris. On her return to the US in 1929, she began a solo and orchestral career in Chicago and New York, where she met and married Ulderico Marcelli (1882-1962), an Italian composer and conductor, with whom she had a son, Victor Marcelli. In the 1950s they moved to Sunland, California, where Call did Hollywood studio work (including playing for the sound track of "Around the World in 80 Days") and later taught violin and piano until she was in her late 80s.

== Career ==
Audrey Call found her niche playing in studio orchestras, where her technique and sightreading skills made her a valuable player, and she often acted as concertmaster. In 1937 she recorded a suite for violin and piano ("Canterbury Tales") with pianist Maurice Krumbein (who also went under the name of Ray Carter). She appears to have stopped composing specifically for the violin after her marriage, but continued to write popular songs. One work, "I Just Telephone Upstairs", written for the "Halls of Ivy" radio show, was recorded and sung by Western crooner Hank Snow in 1952, and made it to number 5 in the Billboard Magazine charts. The song first appeared on the show on November 21, 1951, an episode for which Call also wrote the script. The song was also covered by the Golden Gate Quartet.

She also composed in later years—her last piece was a song written for her retirement home in Santa Rosa, California. Unfortunately, nearly all the scores and published music by her and her husband were lost when the shed they were stored in was flooded.

== Works ==
- "The Witch of Harlem" (violin and piano) this song is her main one
- "Canterbury Tales" (Violin and piano)
- "I Just Telephone Upstairs" (Song)
- "Indiana Lullaby" (song)
