= The Devil and Daniel Webster (film) =

1941 film by William Dieterle

- Original theatrical poster
- Directed by: William Dieterle
- Screenplay by: Dan Totheroh; Stephen Vincent Benét
- Based on: "The Devil and Daniel Webster" by Stephen Vincent Benét
- Produced by: William Dieterle; Charles L. Glett
- Starring: Edward Arnold; Walter Huston; James Craig; Anne Shirley; Jane Darwell; Simone Simon; Gene Lockhart; John Qualen
- Cinematography: Joseph H. August
- Edited by: Robert Wise
- Music by: Bernard Herrmann
- Production company: William Dieterle Productions
- Distributed by: RKO Radio Pictures
- Release date: October 16, 1941
- Running time: 107 minutes
- Country: United States
- Language: English

The Devil and Daniel Webster (originally released as All That Money Can Buy) (Note: The film is most widely known under the title The Devil and Daniel Webster, though it was released under various titles. An original preview print of the film screened in July 1941 under the title Here Is a Man. The film's first theatrical release saw it under the title All That Money Can Buy to avoid confusion with RKO Radio Pictures' The Devil and Miss Jones, released the same year. It was reissued in 1942 as The Devil and Daniel Webster, and later appeared in a truncated cut as Daniel and the Devil.) is a 1941 American supernatural horror film directed by William Dieterle and starring Edward Arnold, Walter Huston, James Craig, and Simone Simon. Based on the 1938 play adaptation of Stephen Vincent Benét's 1936 short story "The Devil and Daniel Webster", the film deals with the theme of the deal with the Devil: A farmer sells his soul for good luck and prosperity, but becomes desperate when the time of his pact is about to end. He asks the lawyer Daniel Webster to help him find a way out of the pact's terms. The play by Benét was in turn based on the libretto created by Benét for an opera adaptation of his short story with composer Douglas Moore, a project he began writing in 1937. Benét and Dan Totheroh adapted the play into the film's screenplay.

Filmed in early 1941, The Devil and Daniel Webster was theatrically released by RKO Radio Pictures on October 16, 1941, under the title All That Money Can Buy, which the studio mandated in order to avoid confusion with another one of their films, The Devil and Miss Jones, released the same year. It was later released as The Devil and Daniel Webster in 1942, and appeared in a truncated version bearing the title Daniel and the Devil in 1952.

== Plot ==
In 1840 New Hampshire, Jabez Stone, a poor kindhearted farmer, is broke and plagued by bad luck. After a series of mishaps, he impulsively declares that he would sell his soul to the Devil for two cents, and moments later, the Devil appears, calling himself Mr. Scratch. He appears to offer Jabez a bargain: if he sells his soul, he will reap seven years of good luck and prosperity. Scratch tempts Jabez by magically revealing a hoard of Hessian gold coins, causing Jabez to sign the contract. He begins his new life with hope, paying off his debts and buying new tools and supplies. While the women are shopping, Jabez meets and becomes friends with the celebrated congressman, lawyer and orator Daniel Webster, a friend of his wife's family and a beloved figure who champions the cause of the poor farmers. Mr. Scratch is also tempting Webster to sell his soul in return for fulfilling his ambition to become president of the United States.

As time passes, Jabez's increasing wealth begins to change him. He ensnares his desperate neighbors with onerous financial contracts, slowly alienating his devoted wife, Mary, and his pious mother. Later, as the townspeople celebrate the harvest in Jabez's barn, Mary gives birth to their first child, whom they name Daniel in honor of Mr. Webster, but minutes later, Jabez discovers the local girl they had hired as a maid has vanished, replaced by the beautiful and sinister Belle, sent by Mr. Scratch. She bewitches Jabez, driving a wedge between him and Mary. As Daniel grows, he too falls under Belle's influence, and she turns him into a spoiled, disobedient brat.

In a few more years, Jabez is one of the wealthiest men in the country. He has built a lavish mansion and throws a huge ball, but it ends in disaster. After a nightmarish dance between Belle and Miser Stevens, whose ruthless standards of debt repayment were a driving force in Jabez's decision to accept Scratch's offer, Jabez finds Stevens dead on the floor. He, too, had signed a pact with Mr. Scratch, and his time was up. Now desperate and realizing that his own time is almost up, Jabez tries to erase the deadline that Mr. Scratch burned into the tree outside the barn, but Scratch appears and again tempts Jabez, offering to extend his deal in return for the soul of his son. Horrified, Jabez flees and chases after Mary. He begs her forgiveness and pleads with Webster to help him find some way out of his bargain with the Devil. Webster, the most renowned lawyer in the country, agrees to take his case. Mr. Scratch again offers an extension in exchange for Jabez's son, but Jabez declines. He then begs Webster to leave before it is too late, but Webster refuses to go.

When Mr. Scratch appears to claim his due, Webster must wager his own soul before his opponent will agree to a trial by jury. Mr. Scratch chooses the jury members from among the most notorious villains of American history, including Benedict Arnold, William Kidd, and Stede Bonnet, with John Hathorne, one of the magistrates of the Salem witch trials as the judge. Webster begins by stating that he envies the jury because, as Americans, they were present at the birth of a nation, but they were fooled like Jabez Stone, trapped in their desire to rebel against their fate. Webster explains that it is the eternal right of everyone, including the jury, to raise their fists against their destinies. They took the wrong turn, just as Stone did, but Stone's soul can be saved. Hathorne asks the jury for its verdict, and in response, the foreman tears up the contract, releasing Jabez from his deal. Webster then kicks out the now-powerless Mr. Scratch, but as he is ejected, the fiend promises that Webster will never become president. The mansion is burned down by Scratch and Belle disappears. Everyone associated with Stone and Daniel Webster prepares for breakfast, with Scratch looking out into the audience for his next target.

== Cast ==
- Edward Arnold as Daniel Webster
- Walter Huston as Mr. Scratch
- James Craig as Jabez Stone
- Anne Shirley as Mary Stone
- Jane Darwell as Ma Stone
- Simone Simon as Belle
- Gene Lockhart as Squire Slossum
- John Qualen as Miser Stevens
- H. B. Warner as Justice John Hathorne
- Alec Craig as Eli Higgins
- George Cleveland as Cy Bibber
- Lindy Wade as Daniel Stone
- Jeff Corey as Tom Sharp (uncredited)
- Carl Stockdale as Van Brooks (uncredited)

== Production ==
=== Development ===
After the success of The Hunchback of Notre Dame (1939), William Dieterle founded his own production company and signed a contract with RKO Radio Pictures, the studio that had produced the film. He decided to adapt Stephen Vincent Benét's short story as the first film that he would make for the studio. Dieterle had appeared in F. W. Murnau's silent film Faust (1926).

The story had been adapted to the stage in 1939 at the Martin Beck Theater to great acclaim, but ran for only six performances because the production proved to be expensive. It was also later adapted as an opera that was performed during World War II by USO troupes.

Benét was invited to write the script for the film adaptation, along with Dan Totheroh, the younger brother of Roland Totheroh, who worked as Charlie Chaplin's top cinematographer from his silent short films to Monsieur Verdoux (1947). There were some differences between the short story and the film. In the original story, Webster regrets Benedict Arnold's absence; in the film, Arnold is present and Webster objects, citing him as a traitor and therefore not a true American, but his objection is dismissed by the judge, and Asa the Black Monk is made up for the film, along with John Smeet, who appears in a deleted scene. The writers also removed Mr. Scratch's other predictions involving Webster's last speech and his sons' deaths in the Civil War. Scratch, Walter Huston's character, is more soft-spoken in the story and the character of Belle, played by Simone Simon, appears in the film but not in the original story.

=== Filming ===
Principal photography began on March 25, 1941. The production was halted on April 22, 1941 after actor Thomas Mitchell, who was cast as Daniel Webster, suffered a skull fracture while filming a scene in a carriage which was overturned after a horse became frightened. Due to his injury, Mitchell was replaced by Edward Arnold.

Filming occurred on RKO Radio Pictures' Pathé studio lot in Culver City, California, on a newly-built 33,000 square-foot sound stage, one of the largest ever constructed at the time.

== Music ==
Bernard Herrmann was chosen to compose the film, after the success of Citizen Kane, having composed music for Charles R. Jackson's 1938 radio adaptation that had aired on Columbia Workshop. Herrmann was introduced to the cast and crew by Dieterle, whom he found to be a very sophisticated director. In addition to his original music score, Herrmann also incorporated several traditional folk tunes, including "Devil's Dream", "Springfield Mountain" and a diabolical version of "Pop Goes The Weasel" played on the fiddle by Mr. Scratch. Herrmann collaborated with sound engineer James G. Stewart to ensure that the music and sound worked well together. To create the creepy sound heard when Mr. Scratch first appears in the barn, Herrmann sent a recording crew to San Fernando to record the sound of telephone wires.

== Release ==
=== Versions ===
The Devil and Daniel Webster received several different releases under alternative titles in varying cuts. A 109-minute preview print of the film bearing the title Here Is a Man was screened in the United States on July 16, 1941. The film was subsequently released under the alternative title All That Money Can Buy in a 107-minute cut on October 16, 1941, premiering at the Radio City Music Hall in New York City.

It was reissued the following year as The Devil and Daniel Webster, and later screened in a truncated 84-minute cut bearing the title Daniel and the Devil in 1952.

=== Home media ===
The preview print of the film under the title Here Is a Man, previously thought lost, was found in the estate of the director and served as the basis for the film's restoration and a DVD release issued by The Criterion Collection on September 30, 2003.

The Devil and Daniel Webster was preserved and restored by the UCLA Film and Television Archive. The restoration's funding was provided by the Hobson/Lucas Family Foundation in collaboration with Janus Films, the Museum of Modern Art and the Library of Congress. The restoration premiered at the UCLA Festival of Preservation in 2022 under the title All That Money Can Buy. This restored edition was released by The Criterion Collection on Blu-ray in March 2024.

== Reception ==
=== Box office ===
Upon its original release, the film was an ultimate financial failure, recording a loss of $53,000 for RKO Radio Pictures.

=== Critical response ===
Bosley Crowther of The New York Times praised Huston's performance in the film but was critical of its direction, writing, "Dieterle has failed to bring into related focus before our eyes that which is supposed to be real and that which is supernatural. The illusion of imaginative release is not properly created, so that one is likely to be confused by the constant interplay of shadow and substance without any explanations."

=== Accolades ===
Award/association	Year	Category	Recipient(s) and nominee(s)	Result	Ref.
Academy Awards	1942	Best Music, Scoring of a Dramatic Picture	Bernard Herrmann	Won	
Academy Awards	1942	Best Actor	Walter Huston	Nominated	
National Board of Review	1941	Best Actor	Walter Huston	Won	

== Parodies ==
The Simpsons featured a comedic spoof of The Devil and Daniel Webster in the 1993 episode "Treehouse of Horror IV". It was called The Devil and Homer Simpson and included a court case including "American betrayers", again including Benedict Arnold and Blackbeard but this time with John Wilkes Booth, Lizzie Borden, John Dillinger, Richard Nixon and the 1976 Philadelphia Flyers. The devil was played by Ned Flanders.

== See also ==
- Politics in fiction
- Shortcut to Happiness, a 2003 modernised remake
- ‘’The Devil and Daniel Mouse’’, a short film from 1979

== Sources ==
- Izzo, David Garrett; Konkle, Lincoln (2002). Stephen Vincent Benet: Essays on His Life and Work. Jefferson, North Carolina: McFarland & Company. ISBN 978-0-786-41364-5.
- Jewell, Richard; Harbin, Vernon (1982). The RKO Story. London, England: Octopus Books. ISBN 978-0-706-42470-6.
- McBride, Jerry L. (2011). Douglas Moore: A Bio-Bibliography. Middleton, Wisconsin: Music Library Association. ISBN 978-0-895-79666-0.
- Smith, Steven C. (1991). A Heart At Heart's Center: The Life and Music of Bernard Herrmann. Berkeley, California: University of California Press. ISBN 978-0-520-07123-0.
- Williams, Tony (2000). "Is the Devil American? William Dieterle's The Devil and Daniel Webster". In Silver, Alain; Ursini, James (eds.). The Horror Film Reader. New York City, New York: Limelight Editions. pp. 129–150. ISBN 978-0-879-10297-5.
