= Nino Marcelli =

Italian composer and conductor

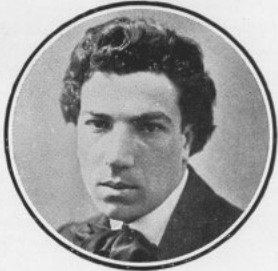
- Marcelli in 1911 as a teacher at the National Music Conservatory of Chile
- Born: about 1890; Rome, Italy
- Died: August 4, 1967 (aged 77)
- Occupation(s): Composer and conductor

Nino Marcelli (about 1890 – August 4, 1967) was an Italian composer and conductor who revived the San Diego Symphony orchestra. Marcelli wrote compositions for musical theatre and oratorio including one for the Bohemian Club.

== Biography ==
Marcelli was born in Rome, Italy, about 1890. When he was a small child, his family moved to Santiago, Chile, and he attended the National Music Conservatory. He became bandmaster to a U.S. Army band during World War I, and toured France. Marcelli became a United States citizen in 1917. After the war, Marcelli settled in San Francisco with a position as cellist in the San Francisco Symphony. In November 1920, Marcelli accepted a position to lead the high school orchestra in San Diego, there being but one high school at the time: San Diego High School. Under his leadership, the youth orchestra gained a national reputation in the 1920s, playing radio broadcasts and concerts in Los Angeles.

In 1922, Marcelli wrote the music for a Grove Play entitled The Rout of the Philistines, a libretto written by Charles Gilman Norris. He reported later that he had been inspired by the operas of Pietro Mascagni. Marcelli used four main themes for Philistine: the theme of Dagon, the God of the Philistines; the theme of Saph, the nobility of the race; the theme of Saph's love for humanity and his belief in brotherhood; and the theme of the forest.

Frustrated with the lack of future professional-level musician work for his graduating high school pupils, Marcelli revived an idea that had for years lain dormant in San Diego: a civic symphony orchestra. He obtained funding from Appleton S. Bridges and reformed the Civic Symphony Orchestra; the first concert was held at Spreckels Theater on April 11, 1927. The 80-strong ensemble, including vocalist Dusolina Giannini from Philadelphia, flawlessly played the prelude from Richard Wagner's Die Meistersinger von Nürnberg, Pyotr Ilyich Tchaikovsky's Symphony No. 6 in B minor, Pathétique and Marche Slave, and Anatoly Lyadov's Enchanted Lake. In following years, the organization played summer concerts at the Spreckels Organ Pavilion and the Starlight Bowl. Marcelli served as musical director from 1927 to 1938. The organization soon became known as the "San Diego Symphony," and was backed by the San Diego Symphony Orchestra Association.

In 1937, Marcelli published two instructional books, one for cellists and the other for bass players, and in 1939 he published an instructional book for orchestra and band.

Marcelli spoke as a guest lecturer at University of Southern California, University of Idaho, Western State College of Colorado and the California Music Colony. He served as guest conductor for the Hollywood Bowl, Los Angeles Philharmonic and the San Francisco Symphony. Marcelli conducted the Ford Symphony at the California Pacific International Exposition in 1935 and 1936.

In 1940, Marcelli served as the Master of San Diego's Grand Lodge. In 1950, he joined with George A. Finder to create a multi-colored plastic ukulele that would aid instruction.

At Marcelli's death, aged 77, in August 1967, the San Diego Tribune memorialized him, saying:

the late Nino Marcelli contributed more than music. In no small way, his founding of the Symphony created the awareness and drive that have made San Diego not only the cultural but an educational, scientific, and economic capital of the West. Mr. Marcelli's niche in the history of our community is secure.

== Works ==
- 1922 – The Rout of the Philistines, A Forest Play, a Grove Play
- Song of Thanks, choral work
- Holy, Holy, Holy, a capella choral arrangement with chimes, with Angela C. Marcelli
- March Processional, heraldic trumpets
- Suite Auracana, orchestral work
- Ode to a Hero
- Music Box Minuet
- Two Christmas Processionals
- Solitude, song
- Deep in the Forest, song
- Harp of Sunset, song
- Song of the Andes, song
- 1939 – Carmelita, light opera
