= Charles Caldwell Dobie =

American novelist

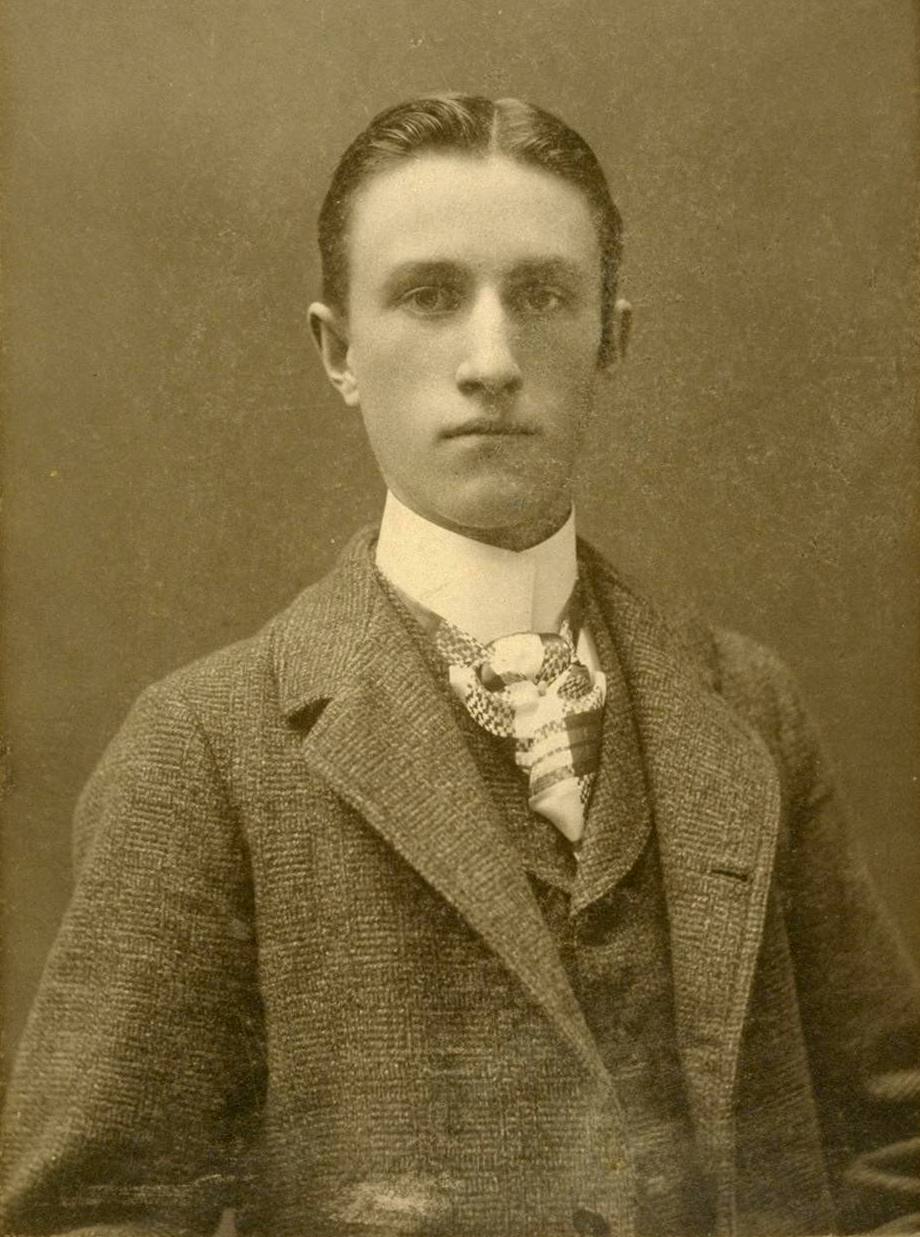
Dobie, c. 1897

Charles Caldwell Dobie (March 15, 1881 – January 11, 1943) was a writer and historian in San Francisco. His novel The Blood Red Dawn was adapted into the movie The Inner Chamber in 1921. His stories were published in magazines and included in anthologies. He also received honors for his work. He wrote several novels. His work featured his hometown, San Francisco. The Bancroft Library at the University of California at Berkeley has a collection of his papers.

Dobie was born in San Francisco. He wrote the Bohemian Grove play for 1920 and was photographed at the grove by a portrait of himself by Gabriel Moulin.

== Bibliography ==
- The Blood Red Dawn (1920)
- Less Than Kin (1926)
- San Francisco's Chinatown
- Broken to the Plow
- Less than Kin (1926)
- Doubling in Brass
- Portrait of a Courtesan (1934)
- San Francisco: a Pageant, illustrated by Edward Howard Suydam (1885 – 1940), D. Appleton & Co. New York, NY and London (1933)
- The Crystal Ball, a collection of his stories about California published as a pamphlet for members of the Book Club of California (1937)
- San Francisco Adventures
- San Francisco Tales
- The Golden Talisman: A Grove Play
