= Peter R. Arnott =

American songwriter

- Occupations: Composer, theatre director, musician
- Instrument: Banjo
- Formerly of: Goodtime Washboard Three

Peter R. Arnott (November 18, 1931 – November 7, 2022) was an American composer, theatre director and banjo player. Arnott was a member of the Bohemian Club and was closely involved with a number of Grove Plays. Arnott was a founding member and banjo player for the Goodtime Washboard Three. He died in 2022.

== Early life ==
Arnott was born in 1932 in Palo Alto, California. His paternal grandparents were John and Virginia Arnott, friends of John McLaren, the designer of Golden Gate Park.

== Banjo ==
Arnott was a founding member of the band Goodtime Washboard Three, characterized as a regional one-hit jug band and as a vaudeville band. Arnott played banjo, Bruce Bratton played washtub bass, and Wayne Pope played washboard and musical saw. In 1959, the band played Friday nights at the Monkey Inn in Berkeley, California. In 1963, when Arnott was absent from the group for two years working in Japan, the band wrote a humorous song about Oakland, appropriately entitled "Oakland", which gained regional popularity. With Dick Fagarstrom covering banjo, the single 45 rpm record "Oakland" was played on many of the San Francisco Bay Area radio stations for a brief period, and has since settled into cult status, with occasional plays on eclectic radio shows such as that of Dr. Demento. Of its 1960s popularity, Bratton said "It got enormous airplay." The Goodtime Washboard Three was asked to perform the song for the Oakland City Council, and the group (with Arnott on banjo) played it from atop the marquee of the Tribune Tower, a performance seen by thousands. The band's quirky style and fame resulted in invitations to the Bohemian Grove where they met powerful people such as Richard Nixon and Henry Kissinger. Bratton later joked that he organized a meeting of all the Bohemian Democrats, held in a telephone booth. The band's first full album was entitled Don't Blame PG&E, Pal, recorded in 1964 at Fantasy Studios in Berkeley and released in 1965 by Fantasy Records. On April 1, 1967, the band appeared on the television show The Hollywood Palace, with Bing Crosby as guest host. Crosby introduced them by saying that he first heard the group play at the Bohemian Grove. Crosby joined the band for the last chorus of Oh By Jingo!.

The band recorded further sessions, but no second album was released. Bratton left for Santa Cruz in 1970, to be replaced by Hal Nachtrieb on tuba. Bohemian George Shultz, United States Secretary of State, invited them to the White House in 1986 to play during a state visit by Philippines President Corazon Aquino. The Goodtime Washboard Three continues to make the odd public appearance.

== Bohemian Club ==
In 1975, Arnott directed the Grove Play Allegory: An Odyssey in Time and Space. Arnott stepped forward with his own script in 1980: Olympus. Ten years later, he directed The Prophecy. In 2003, Arnott composed the music for Fort Ross, the 98th Grove Play.

== Family ==
Arnott married Ann Krikorian from Boston. The two lived in Sausalito, California and were active in city business, politics and art. They assisted with both the Marin Art Festival and the Sausalito Art Festival. Ann Arnott served as secretary for the Sausalito Chamber of Commerce, has been president of the Sausalito Women's Club and was president of the Art Festival Foundation. Arnott's son David Arnott is an actor, screenwriter and musical composer living in Southern California.
