= Ulderico Marcelli =

Italian composer and conductor (1882–1962)

Ulderico Marcelli, also known as Rico Marcelli (October 3, 1882 – August 17, 1962), was a 20th-century Italian composer who became known in the United States for writing operas and musical accompaniment for dramatic performances, and for his skill as an orchestra conductor. Called "Rico" by his friends, Marcelli was born in Rome, then was raised in Chile and educated at the conservatory in Santiago, the capital. Marcelli went to Ecuador in 1900 to teach at the conservatory in Quito, but was disliked by his students, many of whom transferred to study with conservatory Director Domenico Brescia. However, his renown as a skilled violin player grew.

Marcelli married a woman named Clementina (1879–1956); the couple had two daughters, Aida and Gloria Emma, the second born in 1906. On January 26, 1910, Marcelli and his family, accompanied by his sister Julia Marcelli, arrived in San Francisco. By 1913, Marcelli was a member of the French horn section at the San Francisco Symphony as well as concert master for "Demetrio's Venetian Orchestra of Soloists", a well-regarded "cafe orchestra."

Marcelli's friend Brescia moved to San Francisco in 1914. In 1915 at the Panama–Pacific International Exposition, Marcelli conducted the Exposition Orchestra. At the close of 1918, he was conducting at the T&D Theater in Oakland, and had "every lover of good music in Alameda County worshipping at his shrine." In 1919, Brescia described for Marcelli his work for the Bohemian Club as the composer for the summer musical theater at the Bohemian Grove. Brescia and Marcelli gave a concert called "Midsummer Music of Bohemia" at the Tivoli Theatre in San Francisco, with Brescia conducting selections from his Bohemian Club score, and Marcelli leading two movements from his Water Colors. Marcelli joined the Bohemian Club.

In 1920, Marcelli wrote the first of an eventual six Grove Plays for the Bohemian Club, the last in 1961. As well in 1920, Marcelli began conducting the house orchestra for silent film showings at the Tivoli Theatre, a position he kept until he was hired away by Sid Grauman in 1922. Marcelli arranged the official musical accompaniment for the silent film Salomé in 1923. Grauman used Marcelli in his various Los Angeles, California, theaters until the advent of sound in the movies in the late 1920s removed a great number of musicians from their steady jobs. Marcelli worked in radio broadcasting as the first bandleader of the Fibber McGee and Molly show, during the years 1935–1936, and he directed the Rico Marcelli Symphony Orchestra in a series of outdoor concerts at Grant Park Band Shell in Chicago in the late 1930s and 1940s, with as many as 165,000 people showing up for a 1940 performance in which Marcelli's orchestra backed singer Paul Robeson.

On Christmas Day in 1937, Marcelli married a second time, to the soloist violin player of the Fibber McGee band, Audrey Call. The couple had one son, Victor Ottavio Marcelli, who joined the Bohemian Club in his adulthood.

In his leisure, Marcelli painted in oils, mostly landscapes. Two were exhibited at the Bohemian Club in 1922: "Cabeza de Estudio" and "A Bit of Old California."

Marcelli died in Sunland, Los Angeles, California, on August 17, 1962, survived by his wife Audrey Call Marcelli. She died on June 3, 2001, in Sonoma, California, and left as a memorial the Audrey Call Marcelli Music Scholarship, awarded annually to one student at Santa Rosa Junior College.

== Works ==
- 1914 – Maimundis, a one-act opera
- 1914 – Marseillaise, the musical accompaniment to a dramatic work by Andre Ferrier
- 1918 – Water Colors: Four Symphonic Sketches, performed by the San Francisco Symphony 1918–1919 as a "pops concert"
- 1920 – Ilya of Murom, a Grove Play
- 1937 – Lifkronen, a Grove Play
  - ...including The Berserker Dance and The Song of Victory
- 1952 – Tandem Triumphans, a Grove Play
- 1955 – Don Quijote, a Grove Play
- 1958 – Aloha Oe: a Legend of Hawaii, a Grove Play
- 1961 – A Soldier and Mr. Lincoln, a Grove Play
