= Rufus Steele =

Writer and director born in 1877

- Born: March 3, 1877; Hope, Arkansas, US
- Died: December 25, 1935 (aged 57–58); Boston, Massachusetts, US
- Occupations: writer and director
- Known for: The Eagle's Wings, The Purple Highway and The Divorcee

Rufus Steele (March 3, 1877 - 25 December 1935) was a writer and director best known for various films, including The Eagle's Wings, The Purple Highway and The Divorcee.

== Writing ==
Steele is known for various books, including:

- Rule G (1915)
- The Eagle's Wings (1916)
- The Divorcee (1917)
- The Purple Highway (1923)
- Scar Neck (1930)
- The City That Is; the Story of the Rebuilding of San Francisco in Three Years
- The Fall of Ug: a Masque of Fear
- The University and Diversity of Nevada
- Aces for Industry
- What Mrs. Eddy Said to Arthur Brisbane; the Celebrated Interview of the Eminent Journalist with the Discoverer and Founder of Christian Science ...
- The Big Idea
- 7 News Stories About the Movies

== Career ==
Steele has worked in multiple cities, including Hope, Los Angeles, and San Francisco.

Steele got a science bachelor's degree in the Pacific Methodist College in 1896.

From 1900 until 1902, Steele worked as an editor of the Redding Free Press.

In San Francisco Chronicle, he worked as a writer from 1902 until 1904. He was a Sunday editor from 1904 until 1906.

From August 1906 until December 15, 1912, he was a Sunday editor at San Francisco Call.

At the University of Miami, Steele was a coach in magazine special article writing in 1927, and from 1929 until 1931, he was an associate professor in English.

Steele has been listed by Marquis Who's Who as a notable author.

== Films ==
In 1915, Paramount Pictures created a silent movie called Rule G, based on Steele's book. That same year, Steele wrote the script for The Eagle's Wings, a silent film created by Bluebird Pictures.

== Death ==
Steele died on December 25, 1935.
