= Dan Totheroh =

American dramatist

- Born: Webster Daniel Totheroh; 22 July 1894; Oakland, California, U.S.
- Died: 3 December 1976 (aged 82); Oakland, California, U.S.
- Relatives: Roland Totheroh Jack Totheroh

Webster Daniel Totheroh (July 22, 1894 – December 3, 1976) was an American author, playwright, and screenwriter.

== Biography ==
Dan Totheroh was born in Oakland, California and raised largely in Marin County, graduating from San Rafael High School in 1914. He began writing plays in high school, enjoying early success as his first play toured through surrounding towns.

He was drafted into World War I, which thwarted his dreams for an acting career. In the 1920s Totheroh began writing plays professionally, and initially struggled to make a living. He eventually found success and several of his plays were produced onstage in New York.

Some of his most famous works include his collaborations on the screenplays for The Devil and Daniel Webster and The Count of Monte Cristo. He also wrote two novels: Wild Orchard (George H. Doran, 1927) and Deep Valley (L.B. Fischer, 1942); the latter was made into the 1947 feature film of the same name.

His career ended in the late 1940s, and he died in 1976, at the age of 82.

== Selected filmography ==
- Zoo in Budapest (1933)
- Two Alone (1934)
- The Count of Monte Cristo (1934)
- Yellow Dust (1936)
- The Devil and Daniel Webster (1941)
- Deep Valley (1947) [source novel only]
