= Richard Reinhardt (author) =

American writer and historian (1927–2026)

Richard W. Reinhardt
- Born: March 25, 1927; Oakland, California, U.S.
- Died: September 4, 2026 (aged 99); San Francisco, California, U.S.
- Education: Stanford University, BA 1949; Columbia Graduate School of Journalism, MS 1950.
- Spouse(s): Joan Maxwell Reinhardt, b. 1927, m. 1951, d. 2009
- Children: 3 sons

Richard W. Reinhardt (March 25, 1927 – September 4, 2026) was an American journalist, author, and historian whose books and articles focused mainly on the American west, especially San Francisco and California. He also authored The Ashes of Smyrna, a novel set during the Greco-Turkish war following World War I. Reinhardt taught journalism at the University of California, Berkeley for two decades and served on the boards of many civic and historic preservation organizations in the Bay Area.

== Early life and education ==
Reinhardt was the only child of Emil Charles Henry Reinhardt (1896–1974) and Eloise Rathbone Reinhardt (1903–1982). His father founded and ran an advertising agency in Oakland, California He graduated from Piedmont High School in 1944 where he wrote for the school's newspaper. He began studying at Stanford University in the summer of 1944 but in June 1945, enlisted for military service and entered the U.S. Navy in San Diego as a hospital apprentice. He returned to Stanford in the fall of 1946 and graduated in June 1949 with a degree in International Relations. The following year, he went to the Columbia University Graduate School of Journalism, where he graduated in 1950. He was the recipient of the Pulitzer Traveling Fellowship from Columbia, and spent the following year on a trip through Europe and the Middle East during which time he wrote freelance newspaper articles.

== Career ==
After Reinhardt's return from Europe he accepted a reporting position with the San Francisco Chronicle during the Scott Newhall era, where in 1954 he won the Press and Union League Club of San Francisco's Best News Story. In 1957, he received a three-year Ford Foundation grant to pursue his interest in the history of the Middle East. He spent an academic year at Princeton University, where he studied Near Eastern languages and history, followed by a year of him and his family living in Kefissia and a year in the Bebek area of Istanbul, during which time he researched his 1971 novel The Ashes of Smyrna. Upon his return to the U.S. in 1960 became a full-time freelance writer.

=== Books ===
In 1967, Reinhardt published Out West on the Overland Train, a large-format book that interleaved travelogues and illustrations published by American engraver and writer Frank Leslie in the late 19th century with contemporaneous descriptions of a similar trip Reinhardt took by train from Chicago to San Francisco in 1966. In 1970, he wrote and edited an anthology of stories about American railroads and railroad workers called Workin' on the Railroad that was republished in 1988 and 2003.

In 1971, Reinhardt published a novel set during the 1919–1922 Greco-Turkish war that led to the formation of the modern Turkish Republic, which he had been working on since his 1957 Ford Foundation fellowship. The Ashes of Smyrna, published by Harper & Row in the U.S. and subsequently in the United Kingdom, Greece, and Turkey, received positive notices, including a review by British historian and author Mary Renault, who said "Reinhardt presents with a Goya-like ruthlessness, humanity and precision the disasters of war and their dreadful expense of spirit: a war, too, which should not be forgotten by anyone who wants to understand modern Greece." The New York Times stated, "Mr. Reinhardt is an even handed and sympathetic interpreter of the truly Byzantine motivations that pile horror upon horror. As his book unfolds like a great mural, one gets an intense appreciation of the feral hatreds that infect individuals." The book dramatically concludes with the great fire of Smyrna, whose precise origins remain controversial.

Boyhood memories of the 1939 Golden Gate International Exposition, a world's fair held on the man-made Treasure Island in San Francisco Bay to commemorate the completion of the Golden Gate Bridge and San Francisco-Oakland Bay Bridge, provided the impetus for Reinhardt's illustrated history of the fair, called Treasure Island: San Francisco's Exposition Years, which was released in 1973 and reissued in paperback in 1978. In subsequent years, he was occupied with completing two books for friends who died leaving unfinished manuscripts: The Last Grand Adventure by William Bronson, about the Klondike gold rush in the 1890s; and San Francisco: As It Is, As It Was, with Paul C. Johnson, a collection of historic photographs of the city paired with contemporary shots of the same locations, some of which were taken by his oldest son, Kurt.

In 1981, Reinhardt collaborated with photographer Baron Wolman on a picture book of the California coast. Wolman, an amateur pilot and former chief photographer for Rolling Stone magazine, shot the aerial images from his private plane and Reinhardt contributed to the accompanying text. Reinhardt's last book, Four Books, 300 Dollars and a Dream, is a history of San Francisco's Mechanics' Institute that was written for and published by the historic library and meeting club.

=== Magazine articles ===
From the 1960s to 1990s, Reinhardt published numerous articles in periodicals including the original San Francisco magazine, KQED's San Francisco Focus, American Heritage, and World's Fair, a quarterly newsletter. He was an associate editor for San Francisco magazine from 1964 to 1967 and was a contributing editor of American West from 1965 to 1975 and of World's Fair from 1981 to 1995.

=== Teaching ===
Reinhardt was an adjunct professor and lecturer at the U.C. Berkeley Graduate School of Journalism from 1971 to 1993.

For 10 years, he led non-fiction writing seminars at the annual Community of Writers conference in Olympic Valley, started in 1969 by novelist Oakley Hall and writer Blair Fuller. He helped direct the non-fiction program with award-winning San Francisco Chronicle science writer David Perlman from 1991 to 2001.

== Works ==
- The Tall Book of San Francisco (with Kenneth Pratt), H.S. Crocker Co. (1966)
- Out West on the Overland Train American West Publishing Company (1967), ASIN B000O6IBJW
- Workin' on the Railroad Weathervane Books (1970) ISBN 978-0-517-18928-3; Gramercy (1988) ISBN 978-0-517-18928-3; University of Oklahoma Press (2003) ISBN 978-0-8061-3525-0
- The Ashes of Smyrna Harper & Row, U.S. (1971), hardcover, LCCN 69-15284. Macmillan, U.K. (1972), hardcover, ISBN 978-0-333-14172-4; İzmirin Külleri Hürriyet Publishing (1973) hardcover; Oi stachtes tis smyrnis / οι στάχτες της σμύρνης, Ekdotikos Oikos A. A. Livani (1992) paperback, ISBN 978-960-236-282-2
- Treasure Island: San Francisco's Exposition Years (designed by John Beyer), Scrimshaw Press (1973) hardcover ISBN 978-0-912020-24-2; re-released by Squarebooks (1978) paperback ISBN 978-0-916290-09-2
- The Last Grand Adventure (by William Bronson, with Richard W. Reinhardt), McGraw-Hill (1977), ISBN 978-0-07-008014-0
- San Francisco: As It Is, As It Was (with Paul C. Johnson), Doubleday (1981), ISBN 978-0-385-09882-3 (with an introduction by Herb Caen)
- Chinatown, San Francisco (with photographs by Peter Perkins), Lancaster-Miller (1981), ISBN 978-0-89581-038-0
- California 2000: The Next Frontier (edited by Richard W. Reinhardt, with research by Charles Warren), California Tomorrow (1982), ISSN 0012224
- California from the Air: The Golden Coast (photographs by Baron Wolman, text by Richard W. Reinhardt, Michael Goodwin, Tom Johnson and John Burks), Squarebooks (1981) hardcover ISBN 978-0-916290-13-9; republished by Chronicle Books (1984) paperback ISBN 978-0-87701-320-4
- Four Books, 300 Dollars and a Dream: An Illustrated History of the First 150 Years of the Mechanics' Institute of San Francisco Mechanics Institute of San Francisco (2007), ISBN 978-0-9776435-0-9.

=== Contributions ===
- The Ultimate High-rise: San Francisco's Mad Rush Toward the Sky, by the editors of the San Francisco Bay Guardian (1971)
- Three Centuries of Notable American Architects, American Heritage, Scribners (1981) ISBN 978-0-8281-1157-7 (ebook 2018) ISBN 978-1-64019-117-4, "Bernard Maybeck"
- The New Book of California Tomorrow, William Kaufmann Inc. (1984) ISBN 978-0-86576-077-6, "Miss Tilly's Garden," "From California 2000: The Next Frontier."
- A Sense of History, American Heritage, 1985
- Discovered Country: Tourism and Survival in the American West, Stone Ladder Press (1994) ISBN 0-9637623-0-3, "Careless Love"
- The World of Wilderness: Essays on the Power and Purpose of Wild Country, The Wilderness Society, Roberts Rinehart (1995) ISBN 1-57098-017-9, "Desert Storm"
- American Heritage Overrated Underrated: 100 Experts Topple the Icons and Champion the Slighted! Black Dog & Leventhal Publishers (2001) ISBN 1-57912-163-2, "Aviatrix"

== Personal life ==
Reinhardt married Joan Maxwell of San Marino, California in 1951, whom he had dated while they were at Stanford University. They settled in San Francisco and had three sons. Joan died August 23, 2009 and son Kurt died March 15, 2025. He died on September 4, 2025 in San Francisco.

=== Board service ===
- California Historical Society, trustee and publications chair, 1978–85; publications committee, 1994–
- Community of Writers, board, 1982–2000 (formerly the Squaw Valley Community of Writers)
- San Francisco Heritage (which owns/operates the Haas-Lilienthal House), board member, 1980–94; president, 1984–86; chair, 1986–88, 1989–92
- Pardee Home, board member, 1995–2001
- San Francisco Mechanics' Institute, trustee, 1998–2020
