= Wallace Arthur Sabin =

American classical composer

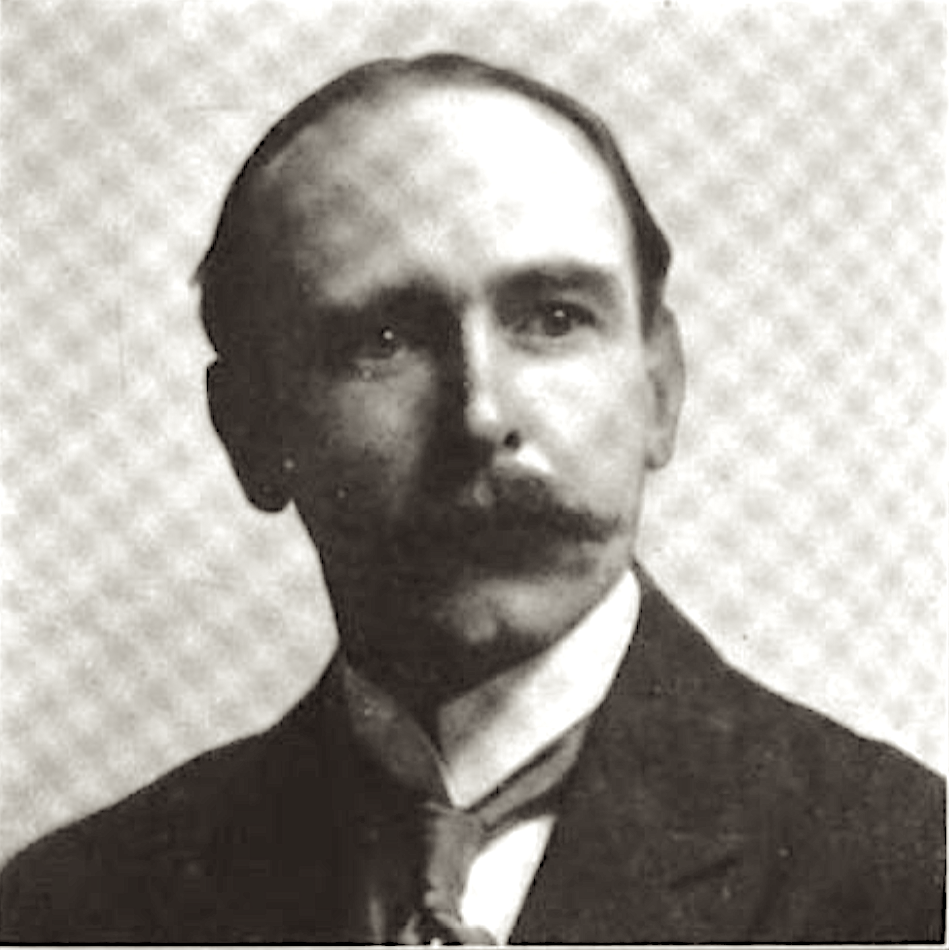
Wallace Arthur Sabin

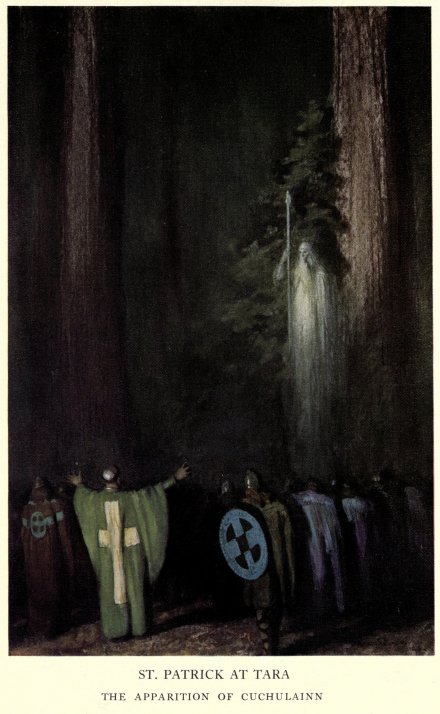
Maynard Dixon's illustration of the 1909 Grove Play St. Patrick at Tara; music composed by Sabin

Wallace Arthur Sabin (December 15, 1869 – December 8, 1937) was a composer and organist, born in Culworth, Northamptonshire, England. He played organ from the age of 13 at various schools and churches in Oxford. He trained in music at Banbury and Oxford, and graduated from the Royal College of Organists in 1888. In 1890, he became a fellow of that college.

In 1894 or '95, Sabin moved to San Francisco to serve as organist for the congregations of Temple Emanu-El and St. Luke's Episcopal Church. He became a fellow of the American Guild of Organists (AGO) in 1899. In 1904, he played organ recitals at the Louisiana Purchase Exposition in St. Louis, Missouri. From 1905 until his death, he played the organ for the First Church of Christ, Scientist in San Francisco, and at Temple Emanu-El. He was president of the San Francisco Chapter of AGO from 1911 to 1913, then again from 1923 to 1926. He was the chapter's first dean.

Sabin was married on April 1, 1913 to Kathryn Wells Bader, daughter of the pastor of Calvary Presbyterian Church. They had one daughter, Patricia.

In 1915, Sabin was the official organist of the Panama–Pacific International Exposition. In one concert, he directed the 400-voice Exposition Chorus while playing organ accompaniment, as Camille Saint-Saëns conducted the 80-member orchestra.

Sabin joined the Bohemian Club, served twice on the board of directors, and wrote music for three Grove Plays in 1909, 1918 and 1934. The first two works were written for tenor, baritone, men's chorus and orchestra. He also composed much incidental music for the club. He was active in other clubs, including the Berkeley Lodge No. 363, Ancient Free and Accepted Masons; the Scottish Rite Consistory at Oakland (where he earned the 32nd degree), the Sequoia Club in San Francisco; the Athenian-Nile Club in Oakland, and the Faculty Club of the University of California, Berkeley. He directed the chorus of the San Francisco Musical Club, the Loring Club (men's chorus), the Saturday Morning Orchestra (women's group), the Twentieth Century Music Club, and the Vested Choir Association of San Francisco.

Sabin set various parts of the Jewish service to music, and is published in Stark's Service Book. In 1920 with Edwin H. Lemare and Uda Waldrop, he helped inaugurate the Bohemian Club's outdoor organ, Austin opus 913, set into the main stage at the Bohemian Grove.

By 1924, Sabin was living in Berkeley. He died at his home there on December 8, 1937. A service was held January 23, 1938 at Grace Cathedral, with a memorial written by Cantor Reuben R. Rinder: "No minister of the Lord ever worshiped at the altar with greater reverence than did Wallace Sabin as he presided at the organ console. [...] His music leads us from egoism to love; from the world to the soul; from the soul to God."

== Works ==
- 1906 - St. Patrick at Tara, Grove Play
- 1918 - The Twilight of the Kings: A Masque of Democracy, Grove Play
- Minuet in D in the style of Handel
- Bourrée in D in the ancient style
- Grand Choeur
- Vierne Symphony No. 3
