= Ray Hackett =

Ray Hackett (né Raymond William Hackett; 5 November 1909 Carlin, Nevada – 29 March 1987 Santa Rosa, California) was an American radio broadcast and dance orchestra leader who flourished from 1928, while attending the University of Nevada, Reno, to the mid-1970s in the San Francisco Bay Area, where he spent most of his professional career.

== Career ==
By the age of 15 (January 1924), Hackett – billed as "The Boy Wonder" – was playing popular piano music in Reno theaters. Hackett was a 1932 graduate of the University of Nevada, Reno. He studied philosophy with plans to become a lawyer. In 1928, while in college, he was leading his own dance orchestra. Following the crash of 1929, Hackett lost his scholarship and began relying mostly on gigs from his dance band to pay tuition. He graduated and pursued music. His primary instrument was piano.

In 1937, Hackett became music director at CBS in San Francisco. In 1939, he was appointed music director of the Golden Gate Exposition at Treasure Island. By 1949, Hackett's band was booked by Music Corporation of America.

Hackett's tenure as music director for CBS in San Francisco endured through the mid-1960s. Hackett was music director of The Bill Weaver Show with Ray Hackett and His Orchestra, which began in the mid-1950s and continued through the mid-1960s.

== Education ==
Pre-college music

Before attending high school (around 1920), Hackett began studying piano with Harriet Irene Peterson (1886–1939).

Primary and secondary schools

Hackett attended grammar school at the Mary S. Doten School (grades 1–8) in Reno, finishing the eighth grade January 25, 1925. Hackett was a 1928 graduate of Reno High School. In February 1928, Hackett became president of the Reno High School Senior Class.

College

Hackett was a 1932 graduate of the University of Nevada, Reno. He majored in philosophy.

== Notable orchestra members ==
- Eddie Duran, jazz guitarist with the CBS Orchestra, late 1950s

== Selected compositions ==
Songs

- "Yearning", song with men's quartet

By Ray Hackett and Theodore H. Post
Arranged by Theodore H. Post (1933)
September 27, 1933, Class E (musical composition) 38645 (Note: Vol. 28, No. 10 (1933), pg. 980)

- "From Time To Time"

Lyrics by Clare Eleanore Hackett, music by Raymond William Hackett
© Sumond Music Co., March 15, 1955 Class E (unpublished musical composition) EU390223 (Note: Vol. 9, No. 1, First Half of 1955 (1956), pps. 59, 257, 338)

- "Where in the World"

Lyrics by Bradford Woodridge Young & Clare Eleanore Hackett, music by Raymond William Hackett
© Bradford Woodrldge Young, Clare Eleanore Hackett, and Raymond William Hackett
February 15, 1955 Class E (unpublished musical composition) EU386461

Grove plays

- The Green Mountain Boys (1963)

Richard L. Breen, author; Raymond W. Hackett, composer; J. Fenton McKenna (1905–1995), director
Bohemian Club, San Francisco
Grabhorn Press, San Francisco

- The Valley of The Moon (1966); OCLC 46976235, 17548614

Ralph Moody, author; Raymond W. Hackett, composer; J. Fenton McKenna (1905–1995), director
Bohemian Club, San Francisco

- Taj Mahal (1981); OCLC 38280653

Francis N. Marshall (1907–1997), author; Raymond W. Hackett, composer-conductor; James Robert Minser (1925–1987), director
Bohemian Club, San Francisco

== Selected discography ==
- The Forward Look (album; musical revues & comedies) (1956); OCLC 13672360

Junior League of San Francisco
With Ray Hackett and His Orchestra

- "Come Join The Band" (78 rpm single), Raycord (19--); OCLC 82069788

1001; mx HR-100
Stan Noonan's Cheerleaders; Ray Hackett and His Orchestra

- "The Indian Jumps" (78 rpm single), Raycord (19--); OCLC 77646425

1001; mx HR-102
Ray Hackett and His Orchestra

- "Our Sturdy Golden Bear" (78 rpm single), Raycord (19--); OCLC 82645240

1002; mx HR-103
Stan Noonan's

- "Oski Jumps" (78 rpm single), Raycord (19--); OCLC 83944610

1002; mx HR-104
Ray Hackett and His Orchestra

== Professional and fraternal affiliations ==
- AFM Local 6 (San Francisco Musicians Union)
- Phi Sigma Kappa, University of Nevada, Reno (inducted around 1929)
- Bohemian Club, San Francisco (joined 1953, president 1968–69)
