= Humphrey John Stewart =

American composer (1856–1932)

Humphrey John Stewart (22 May 1856 – 1932) was an American composer and organist, born in England. A native of London, he came to the United States in 1886, and served for many years as a church organist on the West Coast. In 1898, he was awarded a doctorate degree in music from the University of the Pacific. In 1901, he gave a recital in Buffalo, New York, and accepted a position at Trinity Church in Boston, but after two years he returned to San Francisco. In 1915, Stewart took a position as organist at the Panama–California Exposition in San Diego, and stayed in that city for many years, playing open-air organ concerts at Balboa Park.

Stewart was a founding member of the American Guild of Organists, and was an honorary lifetime member of the Bohemian Club. In the pages of The American Organist, Stewart wrote in March 1919 about what he called the "Messiah Fallacy", a critical analysis uncomplimentary to Handel's Messiah. Stewart described how the music of the Messiah was completely incompatible to the sacred nature of the text, except for the Hallelujah chorus, of which he was non-committal, preferring Beethoven's Hallelujah. A flurry of letters to the editor resulted, some critical of Stewart, some supportive of his stance.

== Works ==
Among his works were an opera, two comic operas, three Grove Plays, incidental music for plays, some works for orchestra, choral music, and some songs and instrumental works; he also wrote church music.

- 1888 - The Nativity, oratorio (church)
- 1889 - Bluff King Hal, romantic opera
- 1890 - His Majesty, comic opera
- 1899 - I behold and lo! anthem
- 1900 - The Conspirators, comic opera
- 1903 - Montezuma, Grove Play
- 1906 - Scenes in California, orchestral suite
- 1906 - The Owl and Care, Grove Play, musical spectacle
- 1916 - Gold, Grove Play
- 1924 - The Hound of Heaven, a Musical Drama
