= Joseph Redding =

American composer and writer (1859–1932)

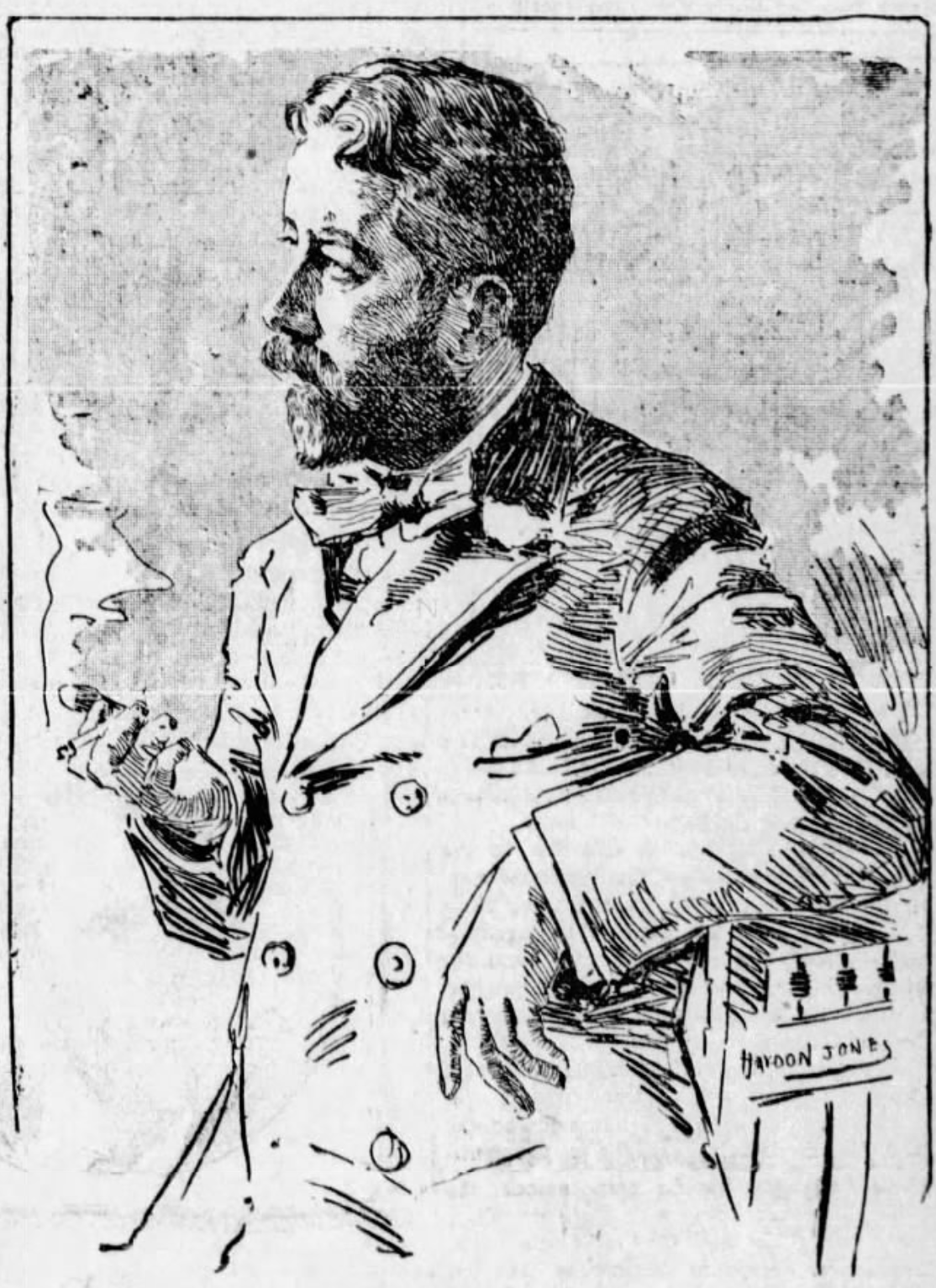
- 1895 sketch of Redding published in The San Francisco Examiner
- Born: September 13, 1859; Sacramento, California, U.S.
- Died: November 21, 1932 (aged 73); San Francisco, U.S.
- Education: Harvard Law School
- Occupations: Librettist; Composer; Lawyer; Civil servant
- Awards: Legion of Honour

Joseph Deighn Redding (September 13, 1859 – November 21, 1932) was an American composer, librettist, lyricist, lawyer, and civil servant. He is best known for arguing the United States Supreme Court legal case United States v. Kagama and for his contributions to American opera which include writing the libretto to Victor Herbert's Natoma (1911) and composing the score to Fay Yen Fah (1925). The latter work was the first grand opera composed by an American to have its premiere in Europe, an achievement for which Redding was awarded the Legion of Honour by the government of France.

Redding was also a songwriter and a composer of works for the piano. He was both composer and lyricist for the popular song "Song to Hawaii" (also known as "Aloha to Hawaii") which was recorded by numerous artists in the 1910s and 1920s. He was a prominent figure in the civic life of San Francisco during the late 19th and early 20th centuries. He played an instrumental role in the founding of the San Francisco Symphony in 1911 and served on the governing board of the symphony during its early years. He served terms as president of the San Francisco Arts Administration and San Francisco's Bohemian Club, and also served a term as commissioner of the California Department of Fish and Game. A talented chess polymath, he was an amateur chess player who won several games against recognized chess masters, including Johannes Zukertort and George H. D. Gossip.

== Early life and education ==
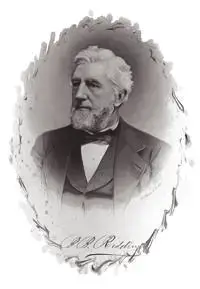
c. 1880 photography of Benjamin B. Redding

Joseph Deighn Redding was born on September 13, 1859, in Sacramento, California. He was the son of Mary P. and Benjamin Barnard Redding. His father, worked as a land agent for the Southern Pacific Transportation Company and the Central Pacific Railroad. The city of Redding, California, is named after Joseph Redding's father. His mother's side of the family had come to California from Massachusetts, and she was a descendant of American Revolutionary War veteran Israel Putnam.

In addition to his career working for railway companies, B. B. Redding was a prominent politician in California who held several different offices during his political career, among them California State Assemblyman (1853–1854), Mayor of Sacramento, California (1856–1857), and Secretary of State of California (1863–1867). He also was a regent for California State University and served a term as president of the board of the California Academy of Sciences. At the time of Benjamin Redding's death in 1882 he was serving a term as commissioner of the California Department of Fish and Game (CDFG). B. B. Redding's ties to the CDFG dated back to its inception in 1852 and he was an active force in that agency until his death thirty years later. Both Joseph Redding and his younger brother, Dr. George Herbert Huntington Redding (born December 16, 1860), would later serve terms as commissioner of the CDFG after the death of their father.

In his youth, Joseph Redding studied with the California pianist Hugo L. Mansfeldt and gave his first public concerts playing piano duos with Mansfeldt at the age of 11. He attended schools in the Sacramento City Unified School District before entering the California Military Academy (CMA) in Oakland, California, in 1871. He began playing chess seriously while attending this school. After graduating from the CMA in 1874, he entered Harvard Law School in 1877 where he graduated with a Juris Doctor degree in 1879. While at Harvard he directed the college's orchestra and won a tournament in billiards at the school.

== Law career ==
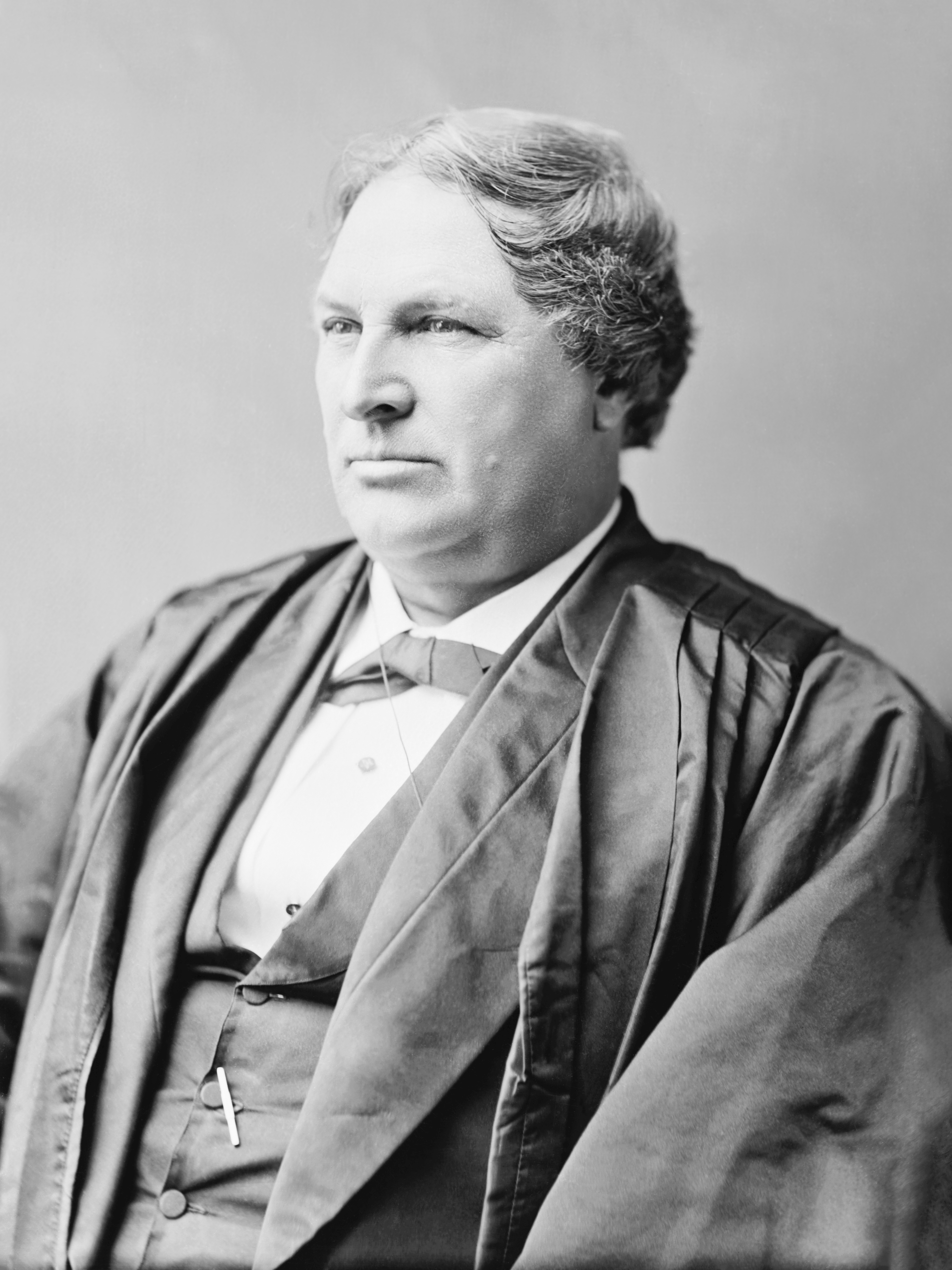
Supreme Court Justice Samuel Freeman Miller, author of the opinion for United States v. Kagama.

After graduating from Harvard, Redding joined the San Francisco legal firm of Hall McAllister at the age of 21. Two years later he left that firm to become an attorney for the land departments of both the Southern Pacific Transportation Company and the Central Pacific Railroad; organizations for which his father had worked as a land agent. Around the time of this change, his father died on August 21, 1882. Ultimately Redding established his own law firm with offices in both San Francisco and New York City.

As a litigator Redding was involved in several important cases that impacted the railroad industry in the United States, among them Central Pacific Railroad v. Mudd (1881), Central Pacific Railroad v. Shackelford (1883), South Pacific Railroad Company v. Dull (1884), and South Pacific Railroad Company v. Poole (1887). In 1886, at the age of 27, he argued an important case before the United States Supreme Court, United States v. Kagama, in which he represented Kagama, a Yurok Native American accused of murder. A landmark case, it upheld the constitutionality of the Major Crimes Act of 1885.

In 1886 Redding won another important case, Goldmark v. Kreling, before the United States District Court for the Northern District of California which was an early ruling protecting the rights of authors and composers. This ruling set an important legal precedent and was frequently cited as a protection for the copyright of sound recordings in California prior to the passage of the CLASSICS Act in 1972.

Redding developed a reputation for his skill in court cases involving contested wills. One of his prominent cases in this area involved the will of American industrialist and railway magnate Collis Potter Huntington. Redding represented Clara von Hatzfeldt in a suit in which she claimed part of the inheritance under the argument that she was Huntington's adopted daughter. Redding was successful in earning her a judgement of six million dollars in that 1901 court case; and his fee of $300,000 was at that time the highest amount of money earned by a lawyer in a court case inclusive of only individual people as opposed to corporations.

== Amateur chess player ==
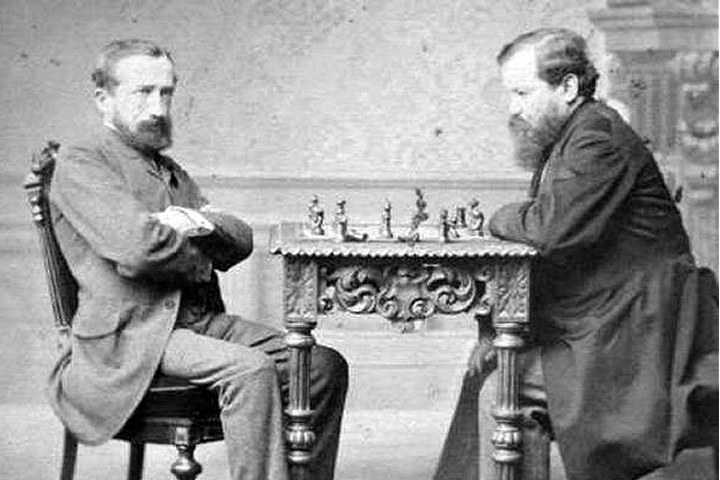
Picture of Johannes Zukertort (left) and Wilhelm Steinitz (right) at the world chess match final in January 1896 held at the City of London Chess Club. Joseph Redding played both chess masters in games, notably beating Zukertort twice.

Redding was a talented chess polymath who had some significant successes as an amateur player playing against recognized chess masters. He was an active member of the Mercantile Library Association of San Francisco's chess team in the 1880s. In 1884 he organized a chess exhibition in the city of San Francisco that featured visiting chess master Johannes Zukertort. Redding beat Zukertort in both a blindfold exhibition match in which Zukertort simultaneously played 12 different opponents, and later in an individual game between just the two men. However, Zukertort beat Redding in a third match in which Zukertort accepted the Evans Gambit.

Redding won a chess tournament in San Francisco in 1888 and was considered the Pacific Coast chess champion at that time. He later won a $50 prize for winning a tournament in San Francisco in which he beat chess master George H. D. Gossip. In 1889 he beat the entire team of the Sacramento Chess Club in a match played over the telegraph.

By 1893, Redding was less active in playing chess, although he went on to play games against Wilhelm Steinitz, Emanuel Lasker, and José Raúl Capablanca. In 1907 he was the guest speaker at the annual Manhattan Chess Club dinner.

== San Francisco citizen, writer, and composer ==
=== Bohemian Club, San Francisco Symphony, and other San Francisco activities ===
Redding became a prominent figure in musical and social circles in San Francisco. In 1883, at a time when San Francisco had no resident orchestra, he was on the governing board of a music festival which brought conductor Theodore Thomas and his orchestra to the city. In 1886 he was elected president of the San Francisco Arts Administration. A member of the Bohemian Club (BC), he participated in the Hi Jinx Extravaganzas put on by the club at their theatre located at Bohemian Grove. The club's 1902 extravaganza, The Man of the Forest, included a through-composed score created by Redding. He also served a term as president of the BC, and was active as a member of the Pacific-Union Club.

In 1909 Redding was one of the founding board members of the Musical Association (MA), an organization whose purpose was to establish a professional orchestra in San Francisco. The MA established the San Francisco Symphony which began operating in 1911, and continued to manage the orchestra until 1935. Redding was a friend of composer and conductor Henry Kimball Hadley, and it is largely through Redding's advocacy that Hadley was appointed the first music director of the San Francisco Symphony in 1911. Hadley tasked Redding with finding the San Francisco Symphony's first concertmaster, and accordingly Dutch violinist Eduard Tak was hired following Redding's recommendation.

Redding wrote the libretto for Hadley's 1912 musical The Atonement of Pan, another work created for performance by the BC. Henry A. Melvin, an associate justice of the Supreme Court of California, was a member of the BC and a talented amateur performer in the BC's musical entertainments. Melvin recorded the song "Noon and night" from The Atonement of Pan for Victor Talking Machine Company ("Victor") in 1913.

=== Natoma ===
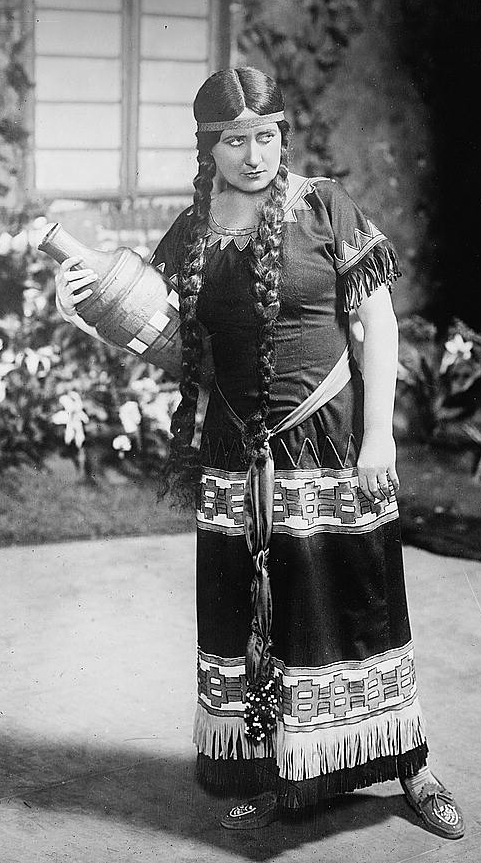
Mary Garden as Natoma (1911) in the original production

Redding wrote the libretto to the 1911 opera Natoma by composer Victor Herbert which starred Mary Garden in the title role at its premiere. The opera is set during the Spanish colonization and governance of the future state of California. Its story revolves around a love triangle in which Barbara, the daughter of the Spanish conquistador Don Fernando, competes with the Native-American woman Natoma for the affections of the naval officer Paul Merrill. The plot is complicated by Barbara's cousin, Alvardo, who wants to marry Barbara and inherit her father's position. Alvardo attempts to kidnap Barbara, but Natoma intervenes and saves Barbara by killing Alvardo. As penance for committing murder, she enters a Spanish convent and becomes a nun. The opera premiered at the Metropolitan Opera House in Philadelphia. This was followed by further performances at the Metropolitan Opera in New York. Andreas Dippel's opera company also toured the work nationally for performances in more than thirty American cities.

Reviews for Redding's libretto were harsh, particularly by the New York press. However, this assessment has been questioned by some scholars, who have documented a trend of the unwillingness of American critics of that period to embrace both verismo opera and operas on American subjects, with Puccini's La fanciulla del West (1910) being another example of a verismo opera heavily criticized by New York critics for its American subject matter. Opera scholar Elise Kuhl Kirk dismissed criticisms of Redding's libretto, stating that "such harsh diatribe was unfounded and no doubt illustrated American critics' unwillingness to accept the new verismo literature as viable opera. Perhaps what they missed was operatic thunder, as in the work of Verdi, Wagner, and Puccini. What they got was closer to Viennese operetta with recitative."

Despite negative reviews, Natoma was more warmly received by audiences and had a better overall popular reception. Selective arias from Natoma were recorded in April 1912 by American soprano Agnes Kimball ("Spring Song"), baritone Reinald Werrenrath ("Serenade"), and tenor John McCormack ("Paul's address") for the Victor Talking Machine Company. The aria "Spring Song" proved popular enough that it was later recorded twice for Victor by sopranos Lucy Isabelle Marsh and Alma Gluck.

=== Fay Yen Fah, "Song to Hawaii", and other compositions ===
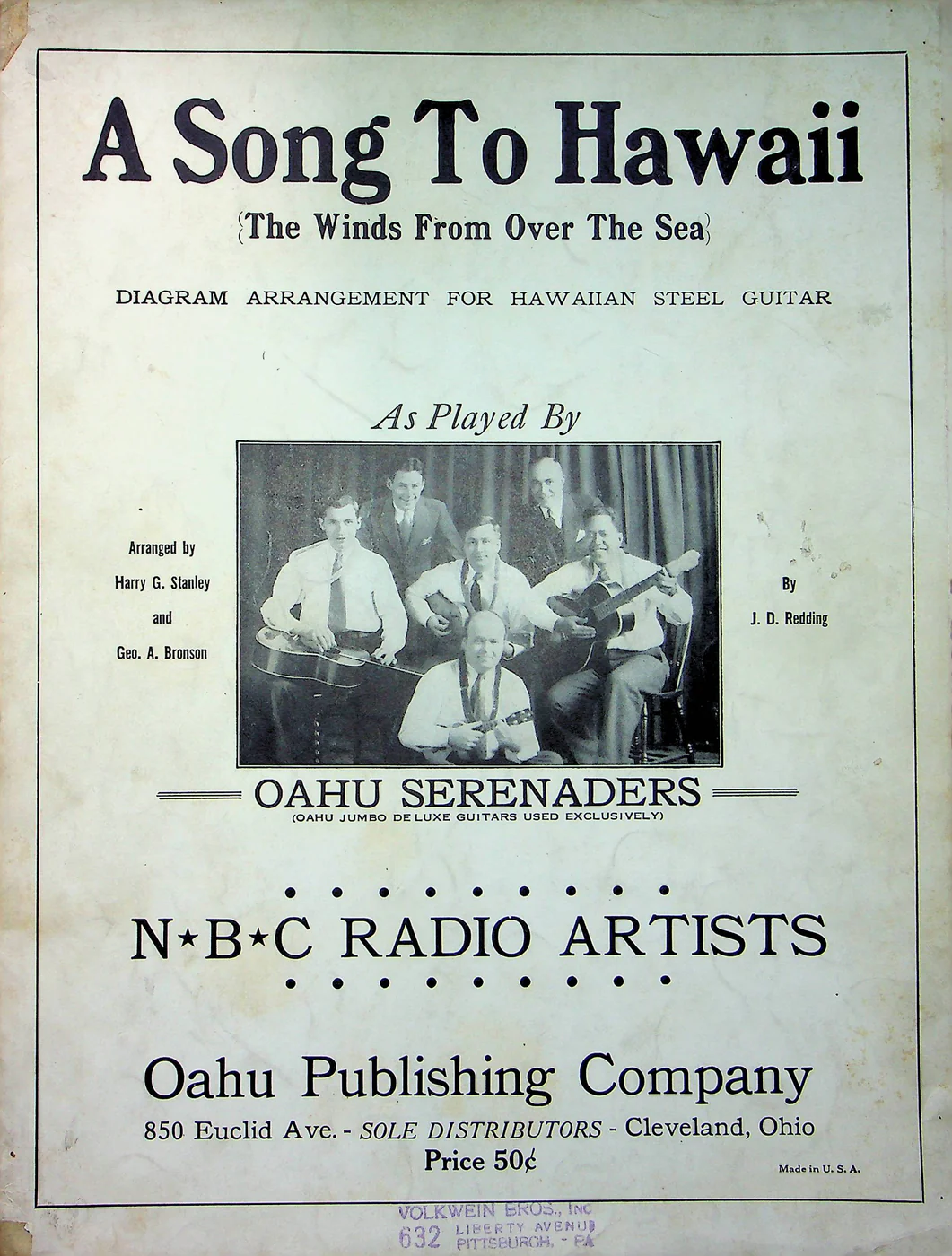
1932 sheet music for "A Song to Hawaii"

Redding composed the music to the 1917 musical The Land of Happiness. He also wrote the libretto for Hadley's 1923 opera Semper, Virens. His only opera as a composer, Fay Yen Fah, premiered at the Monte Carlo Opera in February 1925. It was the first grand opera composed by an American to have its premiere in Europe, and the first opera of any kind written by an American that was staged in France, an achievement for which he was awarded the Legion of Honour by the government of France. It was later staged by the San Francisco Opera. He was inducted into the French Société académique d'histoire internationale in 1919.

In addition to work for the theatre, Redding was also composer of songs and works for the piano. His barrel piano piece Hebe was recorded by Victor and released on record in 1900. Tenor John McCormack recorded his song "Sweet Peggy O'Neil" for Victor in 1920. He had a popular hit with his 1916 song "Song to Hawaii" (also known as "Aloha to Hawaii"). Redding never visited the state of the Hawaii, and wrote this song during a time when Hawaiian music was peaking at a point of high popularity among the wider American public during the mid 1910s. In the year Redding published this song, Hawaiian-themed music dominated the market in sheet music sales by America's music publishing empire, Tin Pan Alley.

Despite Redding's lack of connection to the state, the music editor for "Song to Hawaii", Charles E. King, was from Hawaii, and the work was recorded by several musicians who were either Hawaiian or specialized in performing Hawaiian music. These included separate recordings made by the Hawaiian entertainers Johnny Noble (with the Olympic swimmer and musician Samuel Kahanamoku), Keaumoku Louis, Prince Lei Lani, and Frank Ferera; the latter of whom recorded the work with guitarist Anthony Franchini. Helen Louise Greenus recorded the work with Ferera for Victor. Helen and her sister Irene were ukulele players and singers who were originally from Seattle. The song was also recorded by vaudeville entertainers Wright & Dietrich (Horace Wright and Rene Dietrich), who later became more closely associated with jazz. Johnny Noble also recorded Redding's song "The Winds from Over the Sea" in 1929.

== Family life and death ==
Joseph Redding married Myra Cowles in 1882. Their marriage lasted until Redding's death fifty years later. Their daughter, Josephine Redding, received the Legion of Honor for her work as a nurse in France during World War I. She died at the age of twenty-two in New York.

Joseph Redding died on November 21, 1932, at the age of 73 after a seven-year-long illness. His death occurred in his sleep at his home at 1000 Mason St. San Francisco, California. His funeral occurred at Grace Cathedral, San Francisco, on November 23, 1932.
