= Domenico Brescia =

Italian composer (1866–1939)

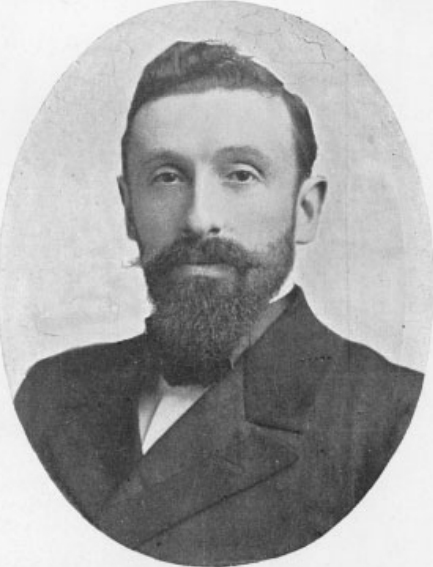

Domenico Brescia (28 April 1866 – 1939) was an Italian composer who taught in Chile and Ecuador, then became known in the United States for writing chamber music as well as musical accompaniment for dramatic performances. Brescia led the Music Theory department at Mills College.

Brescia was born in Pirano, near Trieste in 1866, at a time when the area was part of the Austrian Empire. After studying at the University of Bologna he became a member of the Royal Academy of Bologna as well the Royal Academy of Florence.

Brescia went to Santiago, Chile to teach harmony at the national conservatory, and eventually became the assistant director of the school. There, he met Ulderico Marcelli who was studying violin, brass and composition. In 1903, Brescia followed Marcelli to Quito, Ecuador to become the director of the conservatory there, picking up some of sour-tempered Marcelli's unhappy students. Brescia was the first Western composer to utilize native Ecuadorean elements in his works, including the successful Sinfonia Ecuatoriana. Brescia influenced two students who would later make names for themselves in Ecuadorian contemporary music: Segundo Luis Moreno and Luis H. Salgado. Marcelli left for San Francisco in 1910 and, due to Ecuador's increasing political unrest, Brescia left the country in 1911. By 1914, he had settled in San Francisco teaching voice and composing music.

In 1919, Brescia wrote the musical accompaniment to Life, a Grove Play performed at the Bohemian Grove. Ecuadorian Indian moods were used in two musical numbers. Brescia wrote in the notes to the score that he thought it was the first time that a chromatic set of cowbells, spanning an octave and a half, had been used as a symphony instrument. Brescia brought Marcelli into the Bohemian Club where Marcelli wrote the music for the next year's Grove Play.

In 1921, Brescia's Dithyrambic Suite for woodwind quintet premiered at Elizabeth Sprague Coolidge's Berkshire Chamber Music Festival, with the performance featuring flautist Georges Barrère. Reviewer Carl H. Tollefsen commented on the name Dithyrambic, writing "After hearing the music and in order to link my recollections of it with the title, I decided that the words 'Did he ramble' would bring back both. I'll say he did."

In 1925, Brescia moved to Oakland as professor of music composition at Mills College. He headed the music theory department as well.

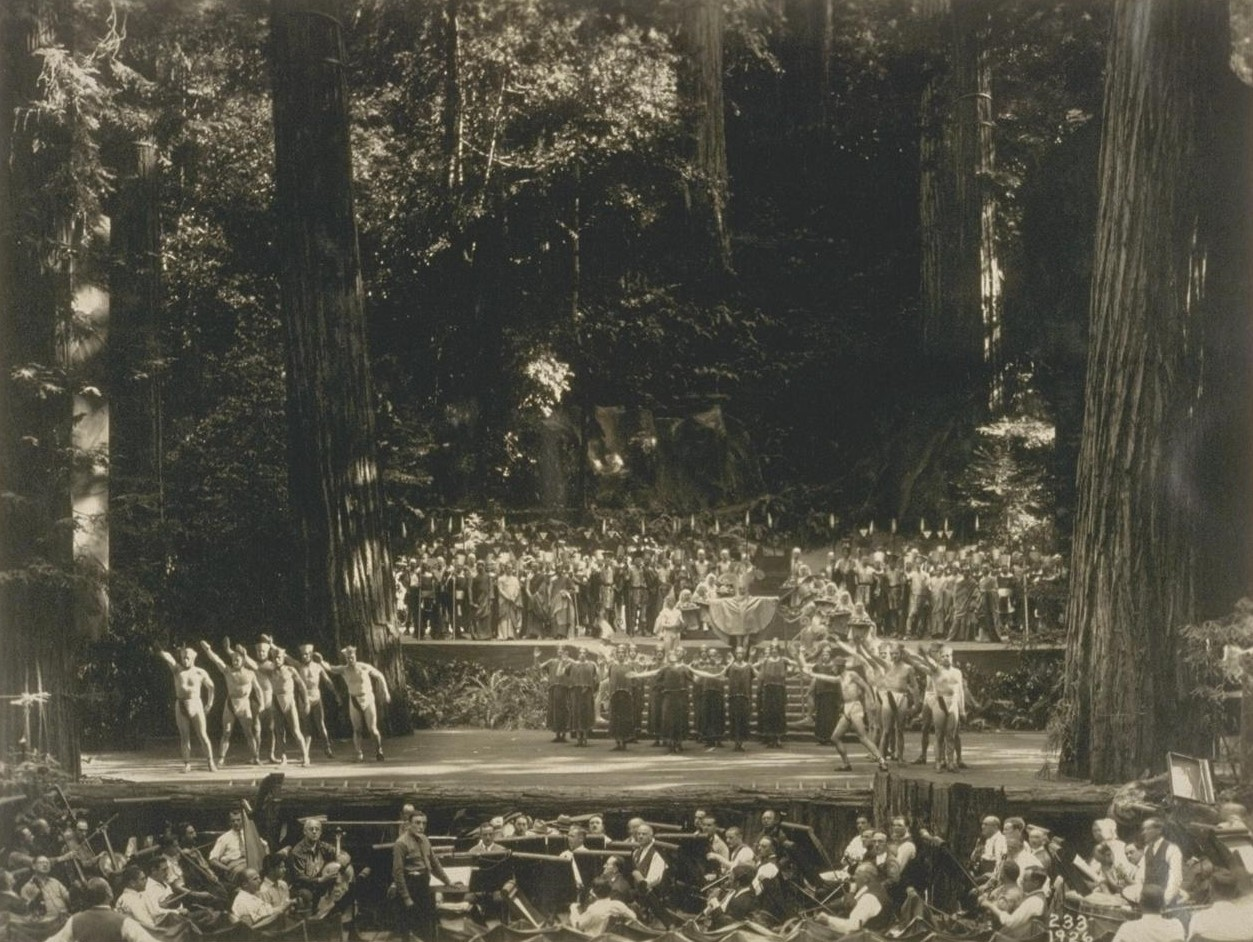
July 1926: Brescia conducts members of San Francisco Symphony in Bohemian Grove dress rehearsal of Truth by George Sterling, Act 2 Scene 2. Photo by Gabriel Moulin.

In 1926, Brescia worked with writer George Sterling to compose the music for Sterling's Grove Play entitled Truth. Brescia's Truth score was one of his most highly-praised works. The Pacific Grove Musical Review, a news magazine for the music business, reported: “Domenico Brescia, the distinguished pedagogue and composer, scored a great personal triumph at the Bohemian Grove on Saturday evening, July 31, when his grove play, Truth, for which George Sterling has written an excellent book, was presented before a distinguished audience.”

National music business magazine Musical America ran a full-page review by violinist and composer Victor Lichtenstein with photographs. Lichtenstein stated the play “was brilliantly presented in the Bohemian Grove, Sonoma County, by members of the Club, assisted by the major portion of the San Francisco Symphony. … Domenico Brescia is the child of his age, and so we are not surprised to find in the musical interpretation of Mr. Sterling’s poem something of contemporary harmonic idiom and a subtle and ingenious use of modern orchestral color.” He continued:

The lyric note of the music is struck in the interpretation of the characters of Egon, the poet, and Dendra, the shepherd girl, likewise in the charming ballet music which accompanies the feast at the king’s court. Music of an Oriental flavor, exquisitely poignant in character, has been assigned to the episode of Egon and Dendra. … A number of these interludes deserve to be popular. There is not a trivial bar in the entire score, in spite of the fluidity of the melodic line, sustained by vigorous rhythms and sometimes strange harmonic combinations. … A distinguished audience … expressed enthusiastic appreciation.

In 1928, Mills completed a new music building which was dedicated with a premier performance of Brescia's suite for piano and woodwinds. Brescia brought with him the favor of Elizabeth Sprague Coolidge, patron to modern chamber music, who subsequently subsidized various music department activities at Mills. Brescia held his professorship until his death in 1939.

Brescia had one daughter, Emma (1902–1968), who was married to American poet Robert Penn Warren during the period 1930–1951, then earned a Ph.D. from Columbia University in 1957 and began teaching foreign language at Mitchell College in New London, Connecticut, in 1963.

== Works ==
- 1900s - Sinfonia Ecuatoriana
- 1919 - Life, a Grove Play
- 1921 - Dithyrambic Suite for woodwind quintet
- 1922 - Second Suite for Flute, Oboe, Clarinet, Horn, and Bassoon
- 1926 - Truth: A Grove Play
- 1928 - Suite for Flute, Oboe, Clarinet, Horn, Bassoon and Piano
- 1931 - Ricercare (quasi Fantasia) e Fuga per Organo
- 1937 - String quartet no. 6 (copyright June 15, 1937)
- Twelve Two Part Inventions for the Pianoforte in Retrograde Inverse Canon
