= Truth (plays) =

1923 and 1926 medieval fantasy plays by George Sterling

Truth; Truth: A Grove Play
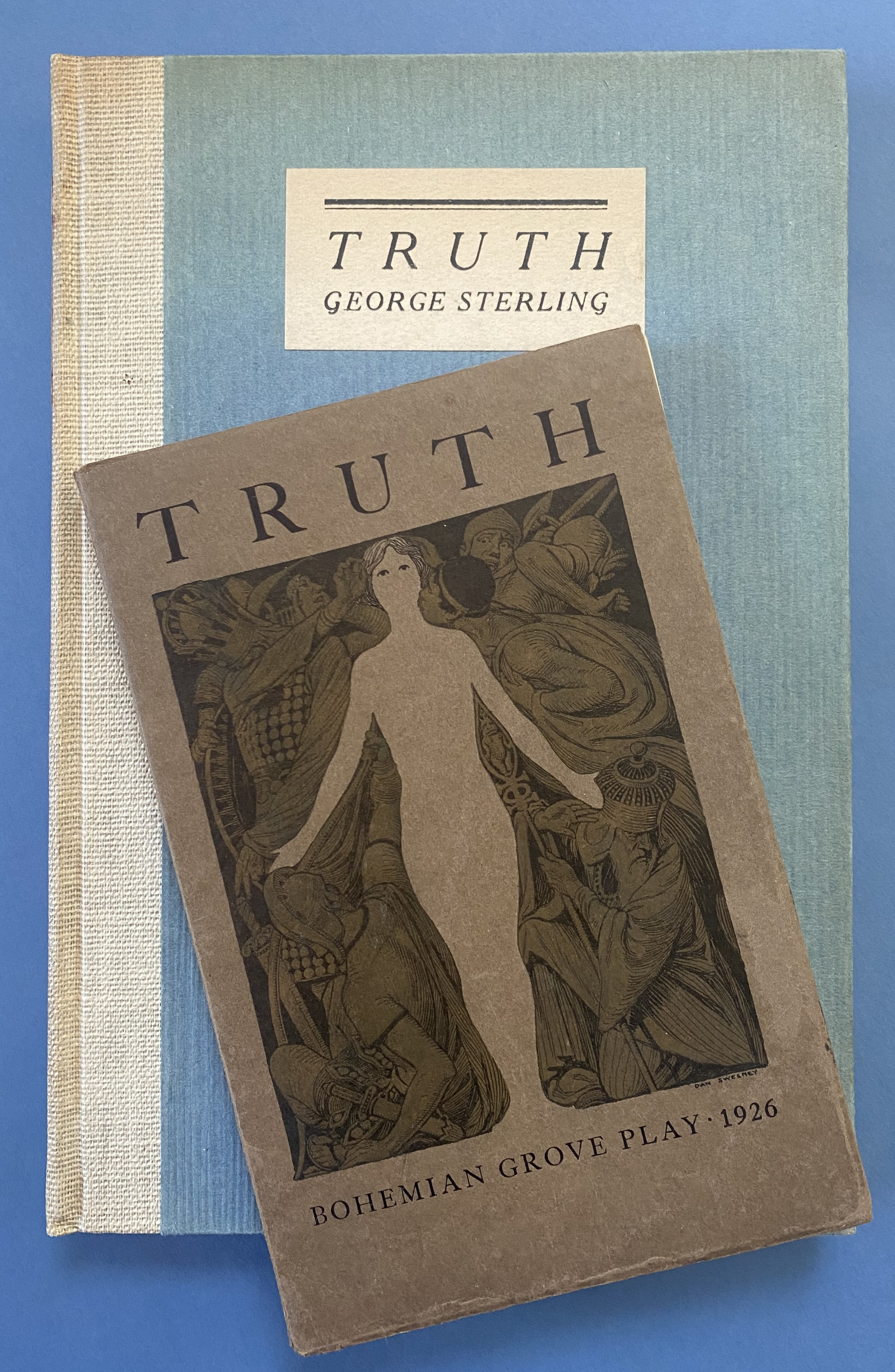
- 1923 and 1926 versions of Truth by George Sterling
- Original language: English
- Written by: George Sterling
- Music by: Domenico Brescia
- Lyrics by: George Sterling
- Characters: Perroh, a sentry; Egon, a poet; Dendra, a shepherd’s daughter; Eor and Enelus, captains of the guard; Truth; Uliun the Dreamer; Akar, Uliun’s wife; Vursol, Akora, and Krood, soldiers; King Ducorial; court singer; High Priest Arkonion; Horeth and Heral, pagan priests; Executioner
- Genre: fantasy
- Setting: In and nearby the medieval walled city of Vae

Premiere
- Date: July 31, 1926
- Place: Bohemian Grove, Monte Rio, California

Truth and Truth: A Grove Play are two versions of a verse drama written in blank verse by American poet and playwright George Sterling. Both versions tell a fantasy story set in and near the imaginary medieval walled city of Vae. The first version (written in 1921 and 1922, published 1923) was meant to be read for pleasure. The second version was written in 1925 and early 1926 to be performed. It was published and staged in 1926 with symphonic music composed and conducted by Domenico Brescia. 1926 reviewers praised both Sterling's play and Brescia's musical score. A half-century later, musical scholars said Brescia's Truth music “represents the high plateau of classical form, structure, and orchestration ... previewing what would become standard film score techniques about a decade later.” A literary historian ranked Truth as “one of Sterling's finest works.”

== Synopsis ==
Truth is set in a fictional medieval walled city named “Vae,” a classical Latin exclamation of pain. At dawn atop the city wall, a guard and the singer Egon see two people approach the city gates. The gates open. Uliun the Dreamer brings in a nude woman who does not speak. She is beautiful, but people cannot bear to look in her eyes. Uliun will not allow her to be covered, but expects people to worship her beauty as he does. A crowd gathers and causes a commotion. The captain of the guards covers the woman with a cloak and takes her to a jail so the king can decide what to do. A guard enters her jail cell for sex but leaves stunned and unable to speak. A second guard enters her cell, looks in her eyes, then says: “This girl is of the everlasting gods.”

Soldiers take her to the king. He takes her to his bedchamber, where he dies. With the king dead, the high priest takes control of Vae. The high priest orders a subordinate priest to cast the woman on a bed of fiery coals. The flames do not harm her. The subordinate goes mad. The high priest commands his priests to crucify Truth's follower Uliun the Dreamer and to throw Truth off a high cliff. Uliun dies but Truth is unharmed. The high priest stabs her in the heart and she seems to die. People riot, but the high priest persuades them to worship the dead “goddess.” On a wooded hillside beyond Vae's walls, Egon and his lover have fled the chaotic city. They see the armies of King Corvannon, Vae's enemy, attack the weakened city. On the hill above Egon and his lover, the nude woman appears in a shining light. She holds out her arms to Egon. He identifies her as Truth, and asks her to leave him to his lover's beauty and love, even though he knows both are illusions. Dawn breaks. In Vae, people kneel before the altar of their new goddess. On the hillside, Egon leaves Truth standing alone, glowing on the hilltop.

== Creation of the first play Truth ==
=== Origin of the title character ===
Sterling's inspiration for his character Truth could have come from several sources, because Truth has been characterized as a naked woman for thousands of years, although not as the title character of a play.

One of the earliest authors to portray Truth as nude was classical Roman poet Horace. In his first book of Odes, published in 23 B.C., ode 24 includes the phrase nudaque veritas, usually translated into English as naked truth—a slight inaccuracy. The Latin word veritas actually refers to a quality a person might have, truthfulness rather than truth. Sterling studied Latin for three years while learning to become a Roman Catholic priest at Saint Charles College in Maryland. He probably encountered nudaque veritas in Horace's well-known poem.

For centuries visual artists have portrayed Truth as a naked woman. For examples, see Gian Lorenzo Bernini’s sculpture Truth Unveiled by Time, Sandro Botticelli’s painting The Calumny of Apelles, Annibale Carracci’s An Allegory of Truth and Time, Jean-Léon Gérôme’s four paintings of naked Truth in a well, Jules Lefebvre’s The Truth (Lefebvre), and naked Truth in paintings by Peter Paul Rubens, Adolphe Faugeron, and Gustav Klimt. In 1896, the Thomas Jefferson Building of the Library of Congress unveiled Henry Oliver Walker’s mural “Lyric Poetry,” which features a naked woman captioned “TRVTH.”

A scandalous movie was a possible inspiration: The 1915 feature film Hypocrites character Truth's onscreen nudity caused controversy in some cities. Hypocrites was written and directed by Lois Weber (then one of the most powerful people in Hollywood) and produced by writer-movie star-director-producer Hobart Bosworth. On July 26, 1913, Bosworth signed a contract with Sterling's best friend Jack London to produce movies based on London's works. Sterling certainly knew of Bosworth through London and possibly met Bosworth during one of Sterling's projects in Hollywood. Weber wrote the scenario for Hypocrites after seeing Faugeron's painting La Vérité. Weber's movie portrays four stories linked by appearances of the nude Truth and her disciple Gabriel. In Hypocrites, Truth's follower Gabriel is murdered for his dedication to Truth, just as in Sterling's play Truth's follower Uliun the Dreamer is murdered for his worship of Truth.

=== Writing the first Truth ===
In June 1921 Sterling stopped writing lyric poems to concentrate on writing a new poetic drama. He wrote to iconoclastic editor and critic H. L. Mencken: “I’ve quit writing lyrics, for a time, though, and am at another dramatic poem I'm calling Truth, showing the dear lady's reception by priest, potentate and populace.”

His new play Truth included six songs. Sterling thought the lyrics of three songs were also good poems. He sold one, “Atthan Dances,” to H. L. Mencken for Smart Set magazine. He sent Mencken the lyrics to a second song, “Egon's Song,” asking: “Is the enclosed ditty too frank for your chaste pages?” Mencken replied: “Egon's song caresses me. I shall steal it for my autobiography. Meanwhile, I see no reason why it should not be embalmed in our great family periodical. My best thanks.” However, Mencken's partner George Jean Nathan thought “Egon's Song” was too risqué, so Mencken had to retract his acceptance. Sterling responded: “Nathan didn't care to use ‘Egon's Song.’ I do not blame him, for it's pretty frank. Into your autobiography with it! You won't be lying.”

=== Finding a publisher ===
After a year and a half of work, Sterling finished his play in the winter of 1922. Now he needed a publisher. Alexander Robertson, the San Francisco bookstore owner who also ran a small publishing company and had published twelve of Sterling's books, could not print Truth because he was out of money: “He is too much in debt to banks and printers ...” Sterling explained to poet Clark Ashton Smith. Sterling couldn't find a publisher. He thought he would have to pay to self-publish Truth, as he had done with his first poetry collection The Testimony of the Suns and Other Poems and his verse dramas Lilith and Rosamund.

Sterling was saved by George Steele Seymour, the head of the Order of Bookfellows, a Chicago-based national organization with about 3,000 members. Bookfellows published between two and five limited-edition books per year and the literary magazine Step Ladder. Sterling explained: “Seymour is honest, I have been led, so far, to believe, and no one seems to be getting anything but kudos from the books he gets out. ... I joined his association out of good nature, long ago, and last winter he wrote asking me if they couldn't print something for me. I was just about to bring out Truth at my own expense, as I'd done in the case of Lilith and Rosamund, and thought it a good chance to save money: all I want is to see the play in print. Then it's off my mind and I no longer give a whoop what becomes of it.” That last remark would prove untrue.

== First book publication and critical response ==
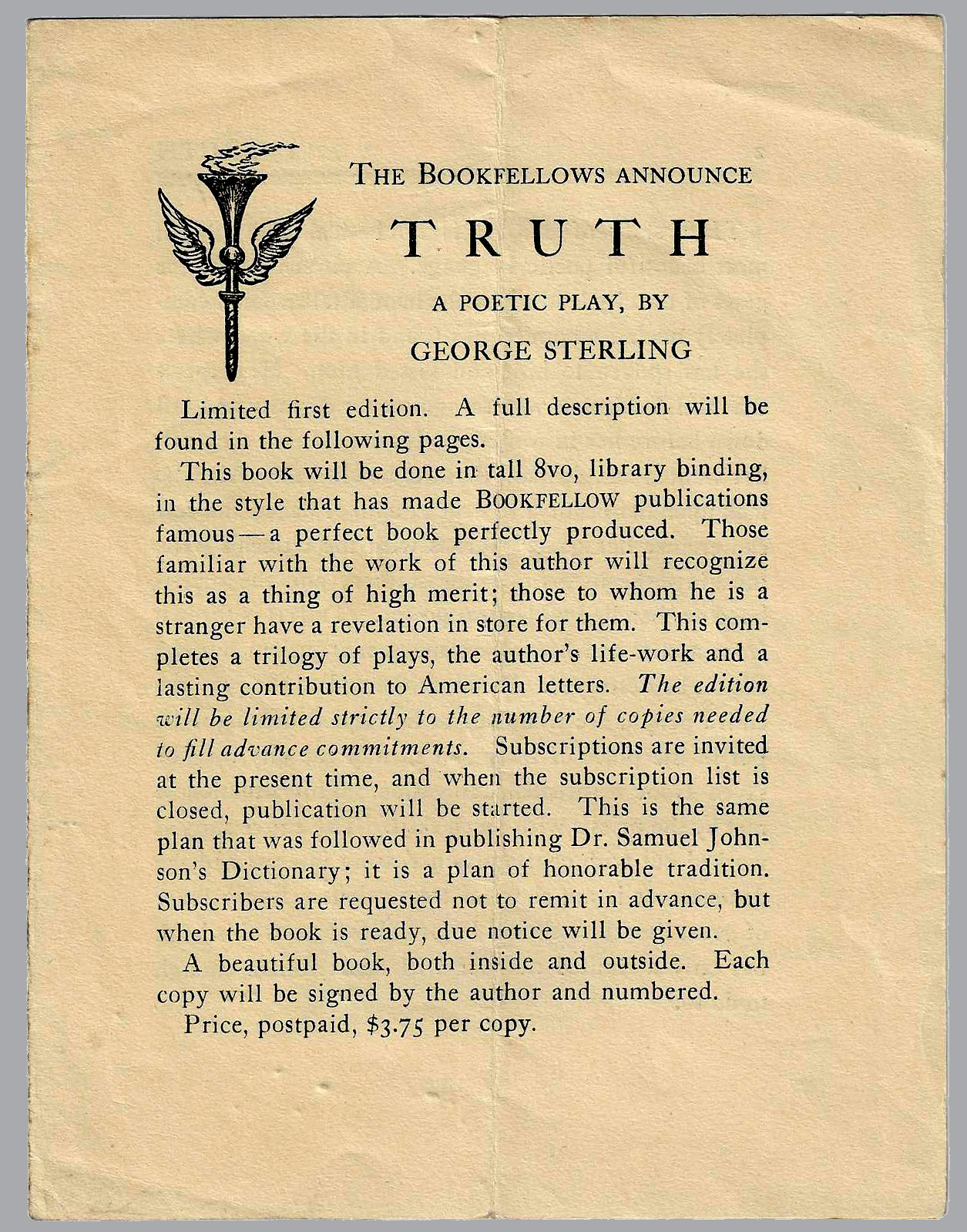
April 1923 Bookfellows leaflet advertising first edition of play Truth by George Sterling.

The Order of Bookfellows published books for sale only to club members. The club bought no advertisements, ran no publicity campaigns, sent no review copies to book reviewers. Its marketing for a book consisted solely of a small, four-page leaflet that it mailed to members. The inside of Bookfellows’ leaflet for Truth was a synopsis of Sterling's play, ending with the declaration that: “The entire story is worked out with constantly increasing interest and the denouement is not short of tremendous. Every lover of great literature should be proud to possess this book but only a limited number will be fortunate enough to do so.”

Page three of the four-page leaflet was unusual. Its headline read: “A Letter from Frederick Coykendall, of the Committee on Publication, Inner Circle of Bookfellows:”

Coykendall was a wealthy businessman, a Trustee of Columbia University, and a member of New York City's Grolier Club of book lovers (and later its president for four years). Coykendall's portrait is in the Smithsonian Institution’s National Portrait Gallery. In large type, the leaflet page read:

My first act of the new year is to send you back the Sterling manuscript. I have kept it longer than I intended because during the greater part of December I was so occupied as to put me out of the mood for fair appreciation of such a lovely piece of writing. I have read it several times and each time it seems better and each time my sense of delight in the theme and its story and in the real beauty of many passages has increased. It is, in my judgment, a work of unusual excellence and one which would set a high standard for the new series of books you have in mind. I very much hope you will be able to publish it this way and that it may have a format in keeping with the rare delicacy of its thought and expression. It has been a treat to me and I am heartily grateful for the opportunity of reading it.

Sterling sent a Truth leaflet to H. L. Mencken, who shot back: “It is amusing to find ‘Frederick Coykendall’ giving his imprimatur to George Sterling. What next, in God's name? Who in hell is Coykendall?”

Each leaflet's back cover was an order form. For each book Order of Bookfellows published, the club counted how many order forms it received, then it printed and bound exactly that many copies, plus a few for the author and for the club's own use. No extra copies were left for bookstores or libraries.

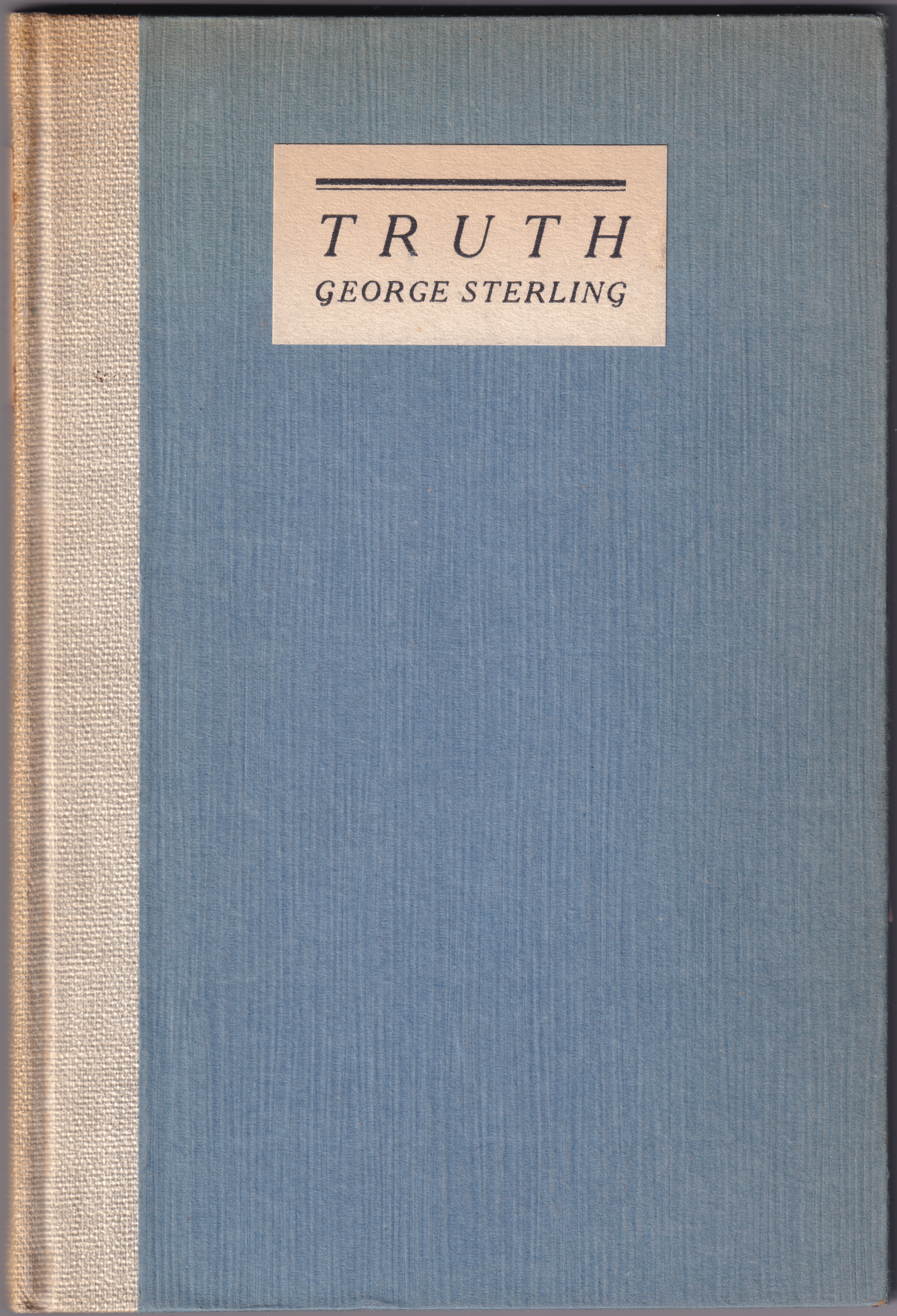
December 1923 first edition of play Truth by George Sterling, published by Bookfellows, Chicago.

Truth was published December 1923 by the Bookfellows in a deluxe collector's edition limited to 285 copies. Truth sold 250 copies to Bookfellows members. The club printed an extra 35 copies for the author and for its own use. Each copy of Truth was hand-numbered and signed by Sterling.

Because copies of Truth were available only to Bookfellows members, critics were unaware of Sterling's new play. One critic did write a lengthy review, reporting: “the poetry is beautiful, especially the lyrics that are interspersed,” and quoting “Atthan Dances” as an example.

More specific was poet Clark Ashton Smith, who wrote to Sterling: “I read Truth ... and admired it. I can see that it would be effective on the stage. The songs are among your best lyrics: two of them (‘Atthan Dances’ was one) still haunt me with ineluctable beauty and strangeness. There is nothing like them in poetry.”

== Creation of the second version, Truth: A Grove Play ==
After Sterling received his bound Truth books, he wanted to have his drama staged as a spectacular Grove Play for the Bohemian Club. Sterling lived in the Bohemian Club apartments in San Francisco. He had contributed to the 1918 Grove Play, The Twilight of the Kings, wrote the Grove Play for 1907, The Triumph of Bohemia, and co-wrote the Club's annual Cremation of Care ceremony. He had written songs, poems, and humor for Club events every year. He was a well-known, respected, and well-liked celebrity at Club dinners, and now pushed Club officers to select his Truth to be rewritten as a Grove Play. Sterling had worked with the millionaire Club member Richard M. Hotaling on The Twilight of the Kings. He inscribed Truth copy 247 of 285 to Hotaling: “May these pathetic incidents awaken in your heart new ardor for Truth!”

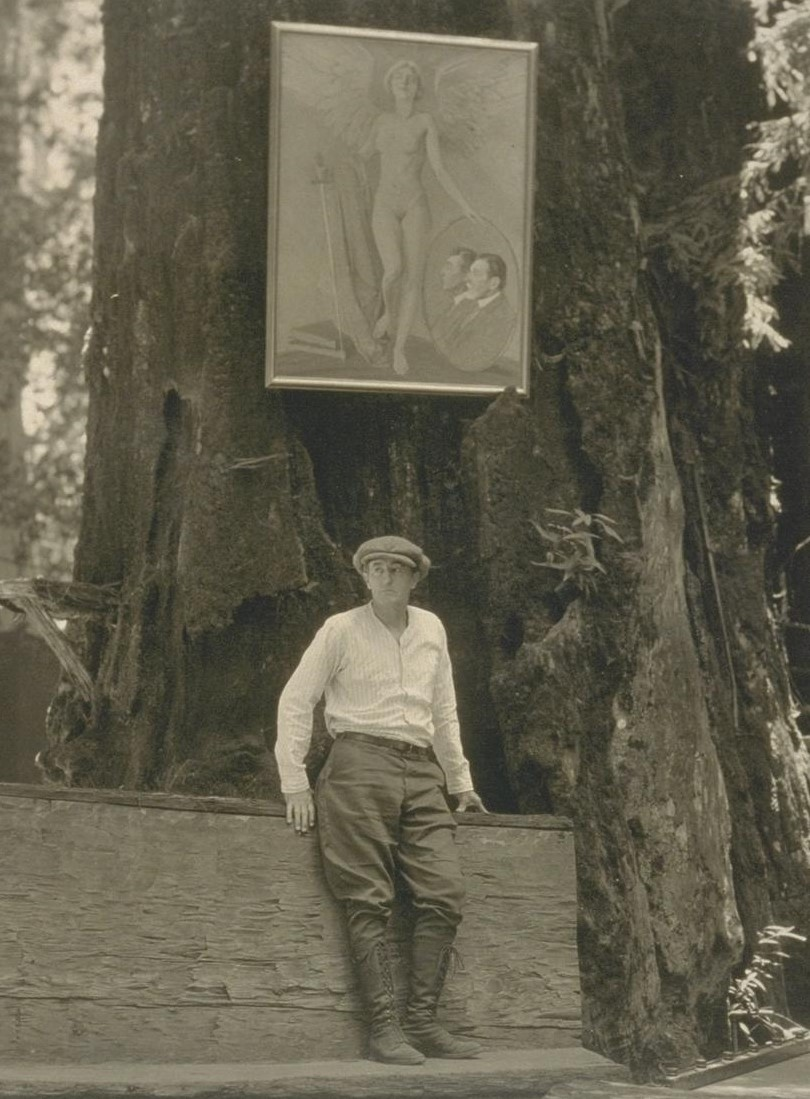
July 1926: George Sterling in Bohemian Grove under a painting of Truth, Sterling, and Domenico Brescia. Photo by Gabriel Moulin.

The Bohemian Club officers in charge of play selection made their choice in mid-1925: They chose Truth. Sterling started revising his play in July. He had written the first Truth as a closet drama, a play meant to be read in a book, not a play to be staged and watched in a theater. The actions in his first Truth took place over more than two weeks, structured across three acts with fifteen scenes in ten locations. Sterling cut whole scenes and restructured the others to compress the action into three days and six scenes. He deleted fourteen characters. Of the play's six songs, he kept two (“Egon's Song” and “Atthan Dances”) but moved them to different scenes. Then he wrote six new songs, for a total of eight. He transformed his closet drama into a stage spectacle to fill Bohemian Grove’s mammoth outdoor stage with an expanded cast of 173 actors and extras, 27 dancers, and a choir of about thirty boy singers from Grace Cathedral. Sterling finished his second Truth in August, 1925.

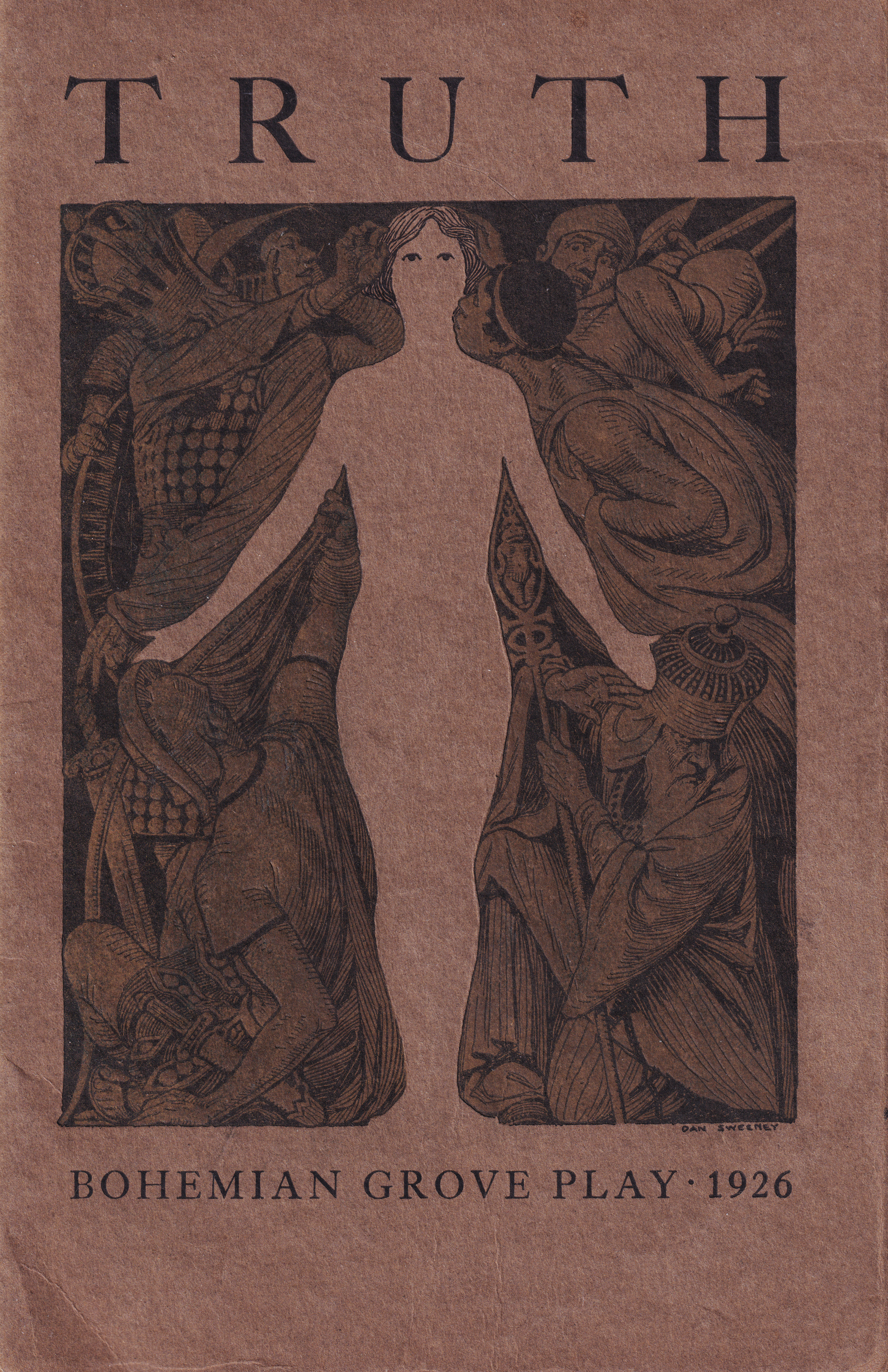
May 1926 first edition of Truth: A Grove Play by George Sterling, music by Domenico Brescia, published by Bohemian Club, San Francisco. Cover art by Dan Sweeney.

Then Bohemian Domenico Brescia used Sterling's new Truth to compose orchestral music to be performed by 58 San Francisco Symphony musicians whom he would conduct. Set designers, costume designers, and other workers prepared to mount the huge production. By Bohemian Club tradition all roles in a Grove Play must be performed by male actors, dancers, and singers. Truth: A Grove Play presented a unique challenge because the title character Truth is a woman who appears onstage naked. This dilemma was solved by sculptor Haig Patigian, who sculpted a female torso that could be worn by a young male actor. The Club scheduled the play's single Bohemian Grove performance for July 31.

The Bohemian Club published 1,300 copies of a book version of Sterling's play Truth: A Grove Play in May, 1926.

== News coverage ==
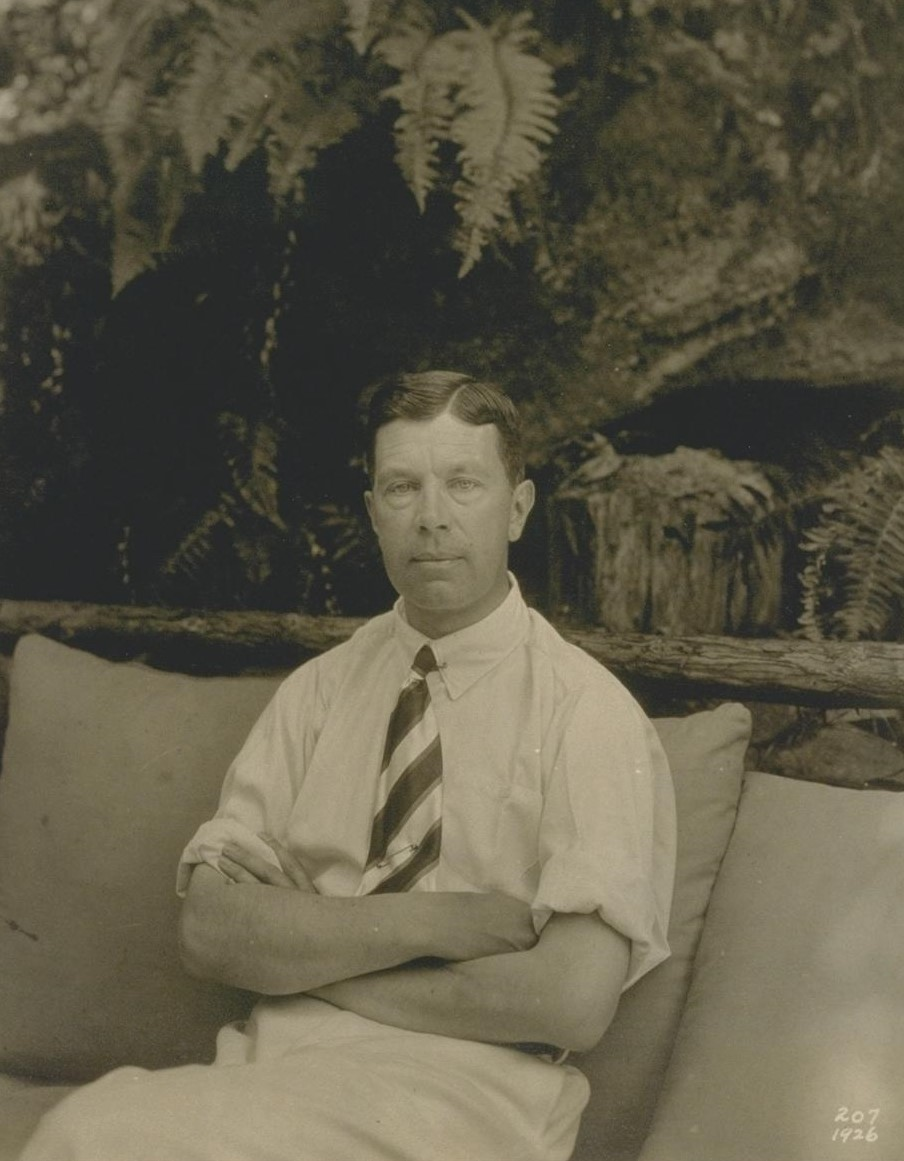
July 1926: Crown Prince Gustav Adolf of Sweden in Bohemian Grove to see the play Truth by George Sterling. Photo by Gabriel Moulin.

Truth: A Grove Play received nationwide newspaper coverage, but not for Sterling's writing. Instead, reporters went agog over celebrities in his play's audience. Attendees included royalty (Sweden's Crown Prince Gustav Adolf), British nobility (Waldorf Astor, 2nd Viscount Astor and his son William Astor, 3rd Viscount Astor), United States Senators (James D. Phelan and Key Pittman), and the wealthy: tycoon Cornelius Kingsley Garrison Billings (one of the five richest men in the United States), billionaire George Owen Knapp, real estate magnate Joel Adams Fithian, multimillionaire Charles Templeton Crocker, bank president William Henry Crocker, and their ilk. They were joined by “many of the greatest figures in art, music, and literature of America,” a newspaper proclaimed. Then-famous artistic attendees included cartoonist George McManus (for most Americans, the biggest celebrity there: the creator of hit comic strip Bringing Up Father, and based on that, seven Broadway shows, nine animated cartoons, three live-action movies, hit songs, comic books, and paperback and hardcover books); artists John Marshall Gamble, Harrison Fisher, Jimmy Swinnerton, and Richard Partington; sculptor Haig Patigian; novelists Charles Caldwell Dobie, Charles Gilman Norris, Stewart Edward White, and Harry Leon Wilson; humorist Irvin S. Cobb; biographer-novelists Thomas Beer and Frank Swinnerton; writer and economist Albert W. Atwood; magazine editor-publisher Charles K. Field; playwright Clay M. Greene; writer and composer Joseph Redding; musicians Mischa Elman, Ossip Gabrilowitsch, Wilbur Hall, and Victor Lichtenstein; opera singers John McCormack and Lawrence Tibbett; actor Everett Glass; and astronomer and MIT president Henry Smith Pritchett.

== 1926 performances and critical response ==
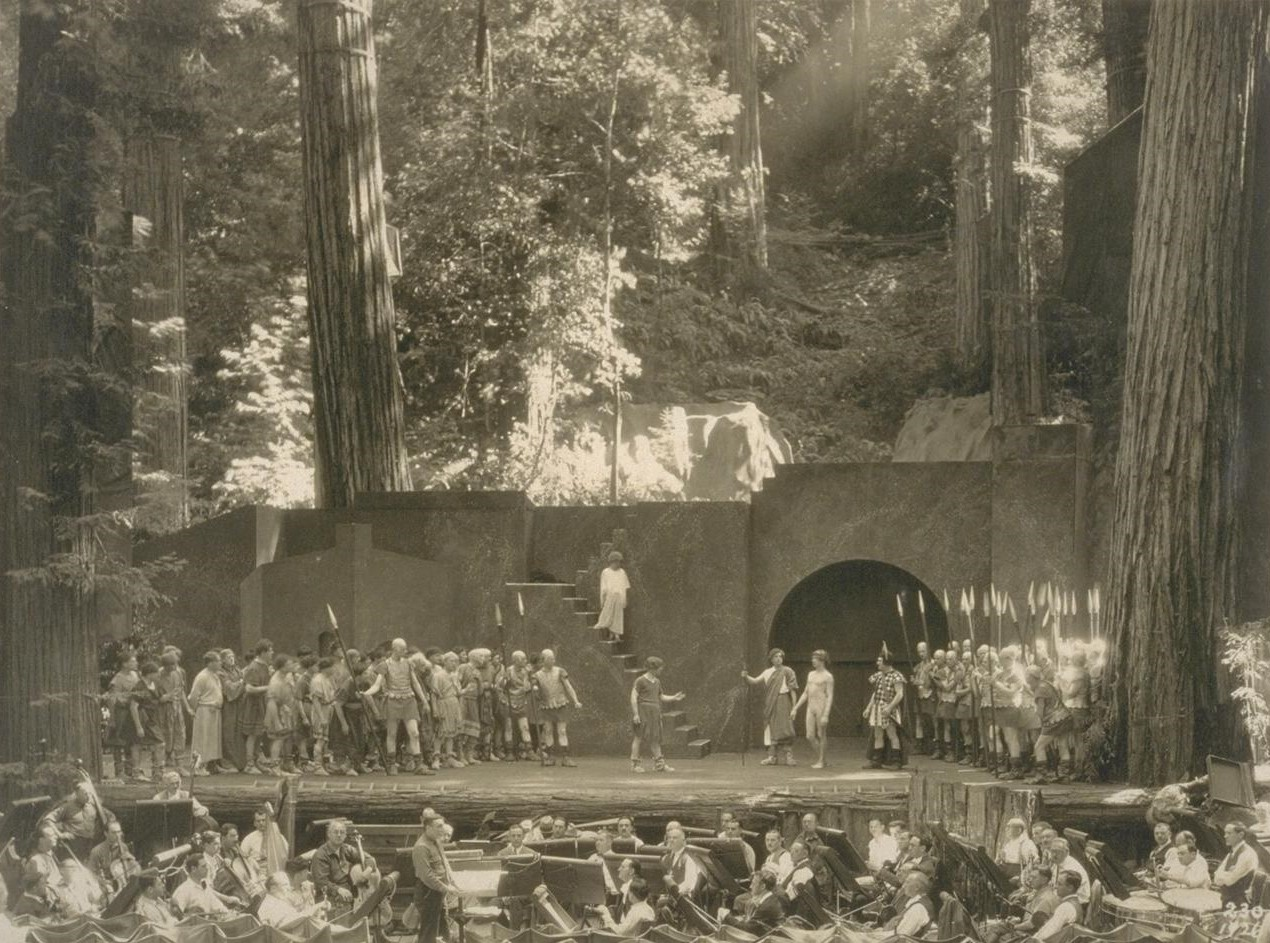
July 1926 Bohemian Grove rehearsal of Truth by George Sterling, Act 1 Scene 1: Vae city wall. Photo by Gabriel Moulin.

The full play Truth: A Grove Play was performed only once, in Bohemian Grove on July 31 before an audience of 1,200.

Reviews were favorable:

- “The grove play last night was accounted one of the finest from a literary standpoint that the club has had. It was written in blank verse, and many of George Sterling's lines were carved out in the full splendor of the classic tradition.”
- “In a setting of unrivaled beauty, with a musical accompaniment touching every chord of harmony, Truth, [was] of glorious radiance ... Held together in common awe were men representing every walk of life.”
- “George Sterling, rapidly becoming the poet laureate of these United States, wrote the poem Truth ...”

The Pacific Grove Musical Review, a news magazine for the music business, briefly reported: “Domenico Brescia, the distinguished pedagogue and composer, scored a great personal triumph at the Bohemian Grove on Saturday evening, July 31, when his grove play, Truth, for which George Sterling has written an excellent book, was presented before a distinguished audience.” The publication stated that full coverage would appear in its next issue.

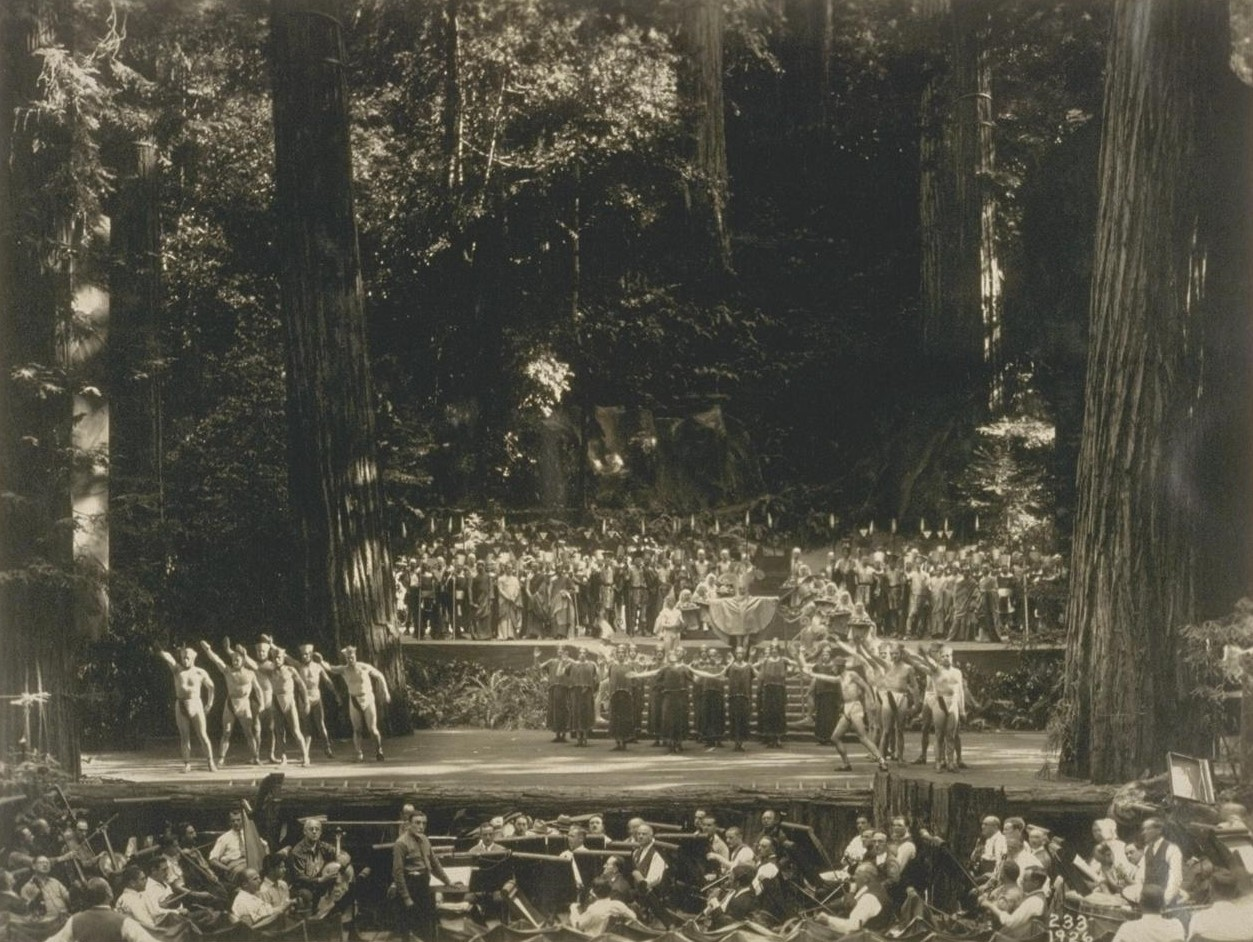
July 1926 Bohemian Grove rehearsal of Truth by George Sterling, Act 2 Scene 2: King Ducorial's court. Photo by Gabriel Moulin.

The next issue, the magazine's front cover was headlined: “Domenico Brescia Writes Charming Music for 1926 Grove Play: George Sterling's Poem Excellent in Literary as Well as Allegorical Beauty.” The entire page was filled with a lengthy review by eminent music critic Alfred Metzger (1875-1943) and a photograph of Brescia. Metzger reported: “Mr. Sterling has woven a very interesting and, at times, thrilling story. ... Mr. Brescia has adapted his music to the poetic sentiment of the libretto rather than to the dramatic, although he has obtained occasional climaxes of unusual force. ... The “Prelude to the Play” is exceptionally skillfully treated, being symphonic in character, beautifully scored as to tone color and shading, and gratefully melodious without becoming banal. ... One of the most magnificent scenes of Truth was Ducorial's Court Scene, wherein the costumes and light effects beggar description. ... In this scene occurred the principal dances, which proved in every way worthy of the immensity of the spectacle and which Mr. Brescia's music accentuated with unerring effect. R. H. Seward as Ducorial, the king, essayed his important role with dignity and imposing histrionic skill. Dion Holm as the High Priest delivered his lines in a resonant, powerful voice that filled the magnificent grove theatre to the remotest corner. The lighting effects were indescribable, illuminating the huge redwood trees to the very highest branches and putting into startling relief some of the most inspiring scenes of the play.”

National music business magazine Musical America ran a full-page review by violinist and composer Victor Lichtenstein with photographs. Lichtenstein stated the play “was brilliantly presented in the Bohemian Grove, Sonoma County, by members of the Club, assisted by the major portion of the San Francisco Symphony. ... Domenico Brescia is the child of his age, and so we are not surprised to find in the musical interpretation of Mr. Sterling's poem something of contemporary harmonic idiom and a subtle and ingenious use of modern orchestral color.” He continued:

The lyric note of the music is struck in the interpretation of the characters of Egon, the poet, and Dendra, the shepherd girl, likewise in the charming ballet music which accompanies the feast at the king's court. Music of an Oriental flavor, exquisitely poignant in character, has been assigned to the episode of Egon and Dendra. ... A number of these interludes deserve to be popular. There is not a trivial bar in the entire score, in spite of the fluidity of the melodic line, sustained by vigorous rhythms and sometimes strange harmonic combinations.
The character of Truth, as personified by a nude form of unearthly beauty, moves, voiceless, throughout the entire action, and, in a striking close, stands on the mountain top, mutely beckoning the people to follow her. Here the lighting effects in the magnificent group of giant redwoods were of celestial and overwhelming beauty. ... A distinguished audience ... expressed enthusiastic appreciation.

=== Concert performance ===
On August 13, the Club presented a concert of music from the play in the Columbia Theatre, a large San Francisco auditorium. The music was performed by the San Francisco Symphony with singers and choruses from the Bohemian Grove performance. After the concert, the San Francisco Examiner said: “Truth is one of the best Bohemian Grove plays that has yet been presented.”

== Later critical evaluations ==
More than half a century later, Thomas Benediktsson in his 1980 book George Sterling said Truth “is one of Sterling's finest works.” He points out that Truth's follower “Uliun is one of those visionaries who think they know a portion of Truth and devote themselves to communicating it to an ignorant and profane world, yet the words of [T]ruth to Uliun—‘God's silence and the world's enormous pain’—reflect the same despair that lie at the center of [Sterling's play] Lilith and [Sterling's essay] ‘Pleasure and Pain.’ ...Sterling shows how Truth is in turn martyred and deified by a multitude who are ignorant of its real nature; and, with a turn of irony, he reveals how true knowledge can only lead to death. ... Egon chooses the illusion of love over the illusion of transcendent Truth as the poem ends. In fact, all the responses to Truth dramatized in the poem are different types of illusions.”

In 1985, musical historians Richard P. Buck and Forrest J. Baird examined and played Brescia's score and were impressed:

The music of Brescia represents the high plateau of classical form, structure, and orchestration applied to the special requirements of the Grove Stage and the Grove Play. ... Brescia's style compared favorably with [Arrigo] Boito and [Umberto] Giordano.
... Brescia wrote essentially three sets of music with wildly different orchestrations and colors. One group of themes emanated from the Prologue Chorus and was solemn or mystic in feeling. The second was characterized by dance themes and exotic colors, while the third was rough, war-like and, in part, regal. By use of clear-cut aesthetic elements, Brescia was previewing what would become standard film score techniques about a decade later. Playing through the songs and duets, one cannot help but compare the music to Welsh folksongs in the Bardic style. In fact the score resembles a style of opera known as the Glastonbury School of West Country England. In particular, we are reminded of Rutland Boughton's Immortal Hour. This score is also noteworthy for use of a boy soprano in a leading role, and the use of the Grace Cathedral Boys’ Choir.

== 1926 characters and cast ==
Perroh, a sentry – E. Malcom Cameron
Egon, a poet – Charles F. Bulotti
Dendra, a shepherd's daughter – Leo Christianson
Eor, a captain of the guard – Boyd Oliver
Truth – Mr. Edwards
Uliun the Dreamer – Austin W. Sperry
Akar, Uliun's wife – H. R. Olds
Vursol, a soldier – Frank C. Thompson
Akora, a soldier – Everett Glass
Krood, a soldier – Benjamin A. Purrington
King Ducorial – R. H. Seward
Clerk of the Court – J. Ralph Sloan
Court singer – Easton Kent
High Priest Arkonion – Dion Holm
Horeth, a pagan priest – Boyd Oliver
Executioner – George L. Bell
Enelus, a captain of the guard – John R. Gwynn
A baker – M. C. Mason
An armourer – Benjamin A. Purrington
A butcher – Frederick W. McNulty
Heral, a pagan priest – Frank C. Thompson
Other soldiers – H. F. McCandless, Percival Dolman, E. L. Taylor, F. A. Corbusier, E. F. Kern, Russell B. Field, E. J. Thomas, C. Nelson Hackett, William G. Volkmann, W. A. Brewer, Jr., John Howell, Scott Hendricks, Mark C. Elsworthy, H. E. Linden, S. W. MacLewee, P. J. Mohr, Neil H. Peterson, F. F. Janney, Chester Herold, B. K. Vaughan, M. A. Yetter, A. H. Breininger, C. E. Greenfield, C. F. Volker, P. H. Ward, A. R. Angell, C. L. Firebaugh, J. W. Whiteford, F. E. Keast, J. H. Duhring, Wilson Meyer, Cassell Aubyn
Townspeople – Fred McNear, J. D. Fletcher, Otis R. Johnson, K. B. Crittenden, H. P. Plummer, H. L. Terwilliger, Harry Robertson, Luther Elkins, A. M. Newhall, F. W. Kroll, F. B. Burland, O. T. Cumberson, Harris C. Allen, H. C. Faulkner, G. H. Henrici, R. L. McWilliams, F. P. Griffiths, Clarence Coonan, Frank R. Girard, W. W. Boardman, A. G. Heunisch, Timothy Healy, Robert Beale, W. H. Crim, Jr., A. H. Brawner, Jr., Joseph J. Henderson, C. B. Bradford, Charles H. Davis, Rea E Ashley, Henley E. Miller, W. H. Robinson, George Hotaling (nephew of Richard M. Hotaling), B. G. McDougall, Eustace Cullinan, T. R. Carskadon, R. D. Holabird, W. R. Bacon, Whitman Symmes, John H. Threlkeld, Horace Clifton, Charles Martin, Tirey L. Ford., Jr., William T. Sesnon, Jr.
Priest-Lords – James Algie, George Anderson, Maurice Anger, R. A. Brown, Malcolm Donald, H. R. Freeman, J. J. Mahan, Meredith Parker, W. A. Mitchell, Ralph Bidwell, E. H. McCandlish, R. M. Neily, F. B. Snook, Ramsey Probasco, H. W. Orr, B. F. McKibben, F. D. Andrews, R. C. Baumgartner, A. G. Kellog, W. R. Kneiss, J. S. Selfridge, M. J. Streeter, Marion Vecki, F. P. Watts, M. E. Creswell, L. E. Dicky, G. B. Koch, H. W. Lawrence, Richard Lundgren, O. R. Marston, R. L. Vaughan, C. L. McVey
Other priests – A. A. Arbogast, W. W. David, David Eisenbach, E. W. Hopkinson, T. G. Whitaker, P. S. Carlton, C. E. Engvick, Eric Gerson, C. R. Hoffman, A. H. Still, G. R. Williams, R. A. Glenn, E. V. Holton, Benjamin Romaine, M. H. White, A. Y. Wood, C. J. Evans, W. F. Hooke, R. H. Lachmund, John McEwing, E. W. Roland, C. P. Tibbe
Lords and ladies of the court – John F. Brooke, Jr., Joseph L. Black, Malcom F. Campbell, C. Templeton Crocker, Gurney E. Newlin, J. A. Thompson, Charles Caldwell Dobie, M. C. Morshead, A. J. Coogan, W. V. Woehlke, E. T. J. Swasey, John J. Parker, H. K. Baxter, Charles L. Bowman, Frank C. Shaughnessy, Milo R. Robbins, L. R. Cupples, R. H. Cochran, Herbert A. Schmidt, Fuller Brawner
Dancers – Leslie Irving, W. T. Lion, J. F. Connelly, E. A. Holt, P. J. Kelley, McClure Kelly, Jr., J. M. Hamill, Calvin C. Chapman, C. W. Fay, Jr., F. W, Fuller, Jr., William Cupples, Junius Cravens, John Breeden, A. E. Larsen, J. G. Sutton, Jr.
Leader of dancers – A. P. Macdonald
Lead solo dancers – R. P. Hooper, Marshall Hale, Jr.
Court musicians and servitors – F. Nash Cartan, Arden Davidson, Myron E. Etienne, Ray Durney, Alex J. Young, Jr.
