= Hypocrites (1915 film) =

1915 film by Lois Weber

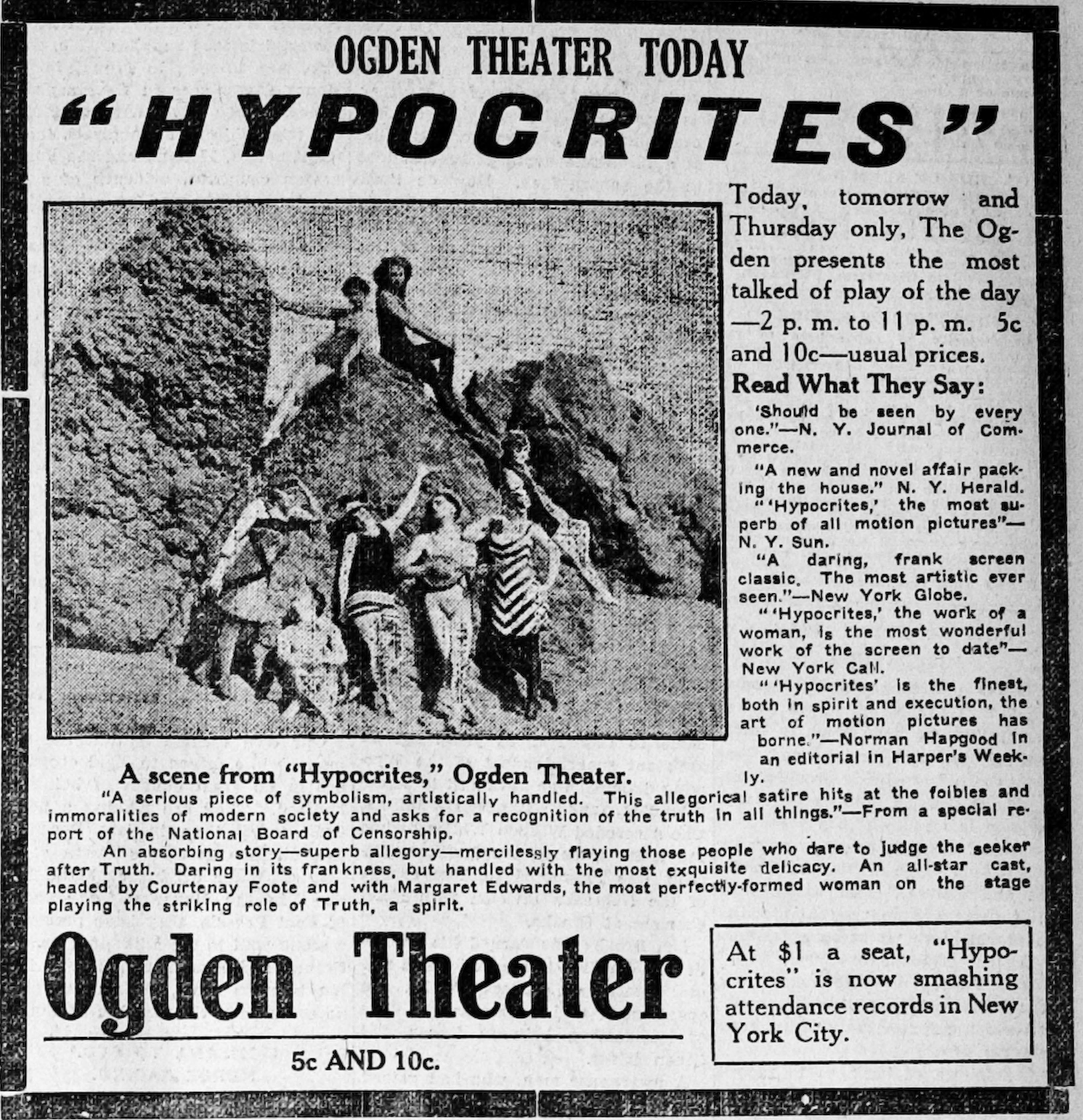
- Newspaper advertisement
- Directed by: Lois Weber (uncredited)
- Written by: Lois Weber
- Produced by: Lois Weber; Phillips Smalley
- Starring: Courtenay Foote; Herbert Standing
- Cinematography: Dal Clawson; George W. Hill
- Production company: Bosworth Inc.
- Distributed by: Paramount Pictures
- Release date: January 20, 1915 (NYC)
- Running time: 49 minutes
- Country: United States
- Language: Silent
- Budget: $18,000
- Box office: $119,000 (U.S.)

Hypocrites (1915)

Hypocrites, also known as The Hypocrites and The Naked Truth, is a 1915 silent drama film written and directed by Lois Weber (1879–1939). The film contains several full nude scenes, and is said to include the first appearance of full frontal nudity in a non-pornographic film by an American actress (Margaret Edwards). The film is regarded as anticlerical, and the nudity, after causing trouble with censorship, was deemed justified by its religious context.

== Cast ==
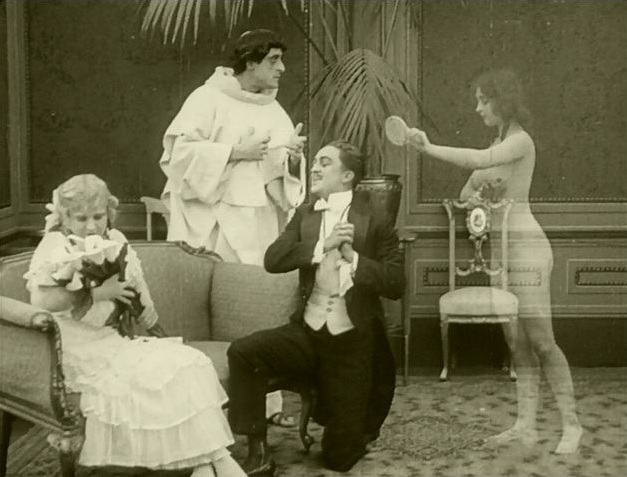
Margaret Edwards (right) as "Naked Truth" in Hypocrites

- Courtenay Foote as Gabriel, the Ascetic / Gabriel, a minister
- Herbert Standing as The Abbot / A pillar of the church
- Margaret Edwards as Truth
- Myrtle Stedman as a nun / A choir singer
- Adele Farrington as The Queen / An aristocrat
- Dixie Carr as a Magdalen
- Nigel De Brulier as a member of the choir / monk
- Matty Roubert as Boy kneeling beside cradle
- Charles Villiers as the Minister
- Vera Lewis as Parishioner (uncredited)

Cast notes:

- Margaret Edwards was 17 years old when she was discovered by Lois Weber.

== Production ==
Writer-director Lois Weber attributed to Adolphe Faugeron's painting La Vérité (The Truth) as the inspiration for the film. During shooting, production had to be moved three times, due to the lack of a permanent studio.

Edwards' scenes, in which she appeared nude, were shot on a closed set, with only Weber, who directed the scenes, Edwards and a cameraman.

Dal Clawson devised special photographic techniques for the film, which was shot by George W. Hill. Sometimes six exposures were involved. The use in the film of traveling double exposure sequences of the woman is considered impressive for 1915.

It is thought that Weber may have re-edited the film after early review were published, before its official opening on January 20, 1915, at the Longacre Theater in New York City.

== Reception ==
The film was passed by the British Board of Film Censors. However, because of the full and recurring nudity through the film, it caused riots in New York City, was banned in Ohio, and was subject to censorship in Boston when the mayor demanded that the film negatives be painted over to clothe the woman.

The film was re-issued in 1916.

Most of the film has survived, though some scenes have suffered from some serious nitrate decomposition in places especially at the beginning and cannot be restored. A print of the film is kept in the Library of Congress.

== Influence ==
The characters and structure of the 1915 Hypocrites may have influenced the characters and structure of the two Truth plays by poet and playwright George Sterling.

== Further viewing ==
- Hypocrites (1915) Uploaded by Silent Movie Cinema on August 15, 2018 is available for free viewing and download at the Internet Archive
- Hypocrites (1915) Uploaded by jakej on December 4, 2020 is available for free viewing and download at the Internet Archive
- Hypocrites (1915) Uploaded by movieman63 on August 26, 2017 is available for free viewing and download at the Internet Archive
- Hypocrites (1915) Uploaded by kittygator on August 27, 2016 is available for free viewing and download at the Internet Archive
- Hypocrites (1915) Uploaded by Edward Boensnes on YouTube
- Hypocrites (1915) Uploaded by Maria Gelpí Rd on YouTube
- Hypocrites (1915) Uploaded by Women's Film Classics on YouTube
- Hypocrites (1915) Uploaded by Motion Pictures on YouTube
- Hypocrites (1915) Uploaded by Domitor Domitor on YouTube
