= Carl E. Olivebring =

Swedish singer (1919–2002)

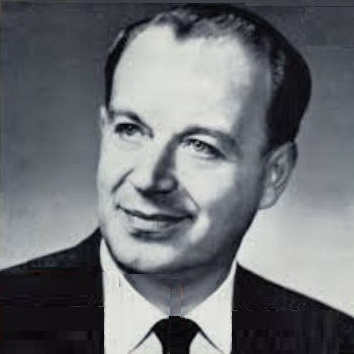
Olivebring in 1965

Carl E. Olivebring (originally Carl-Erik Gerhard Andersson, also known as Carl Olivebring and Carl-Erik Olivebring, April 20, 1919 – October 8, 2002), was a Swedish baritone singer.

Olivebring was born in Hedemora. His mother Judit Andersson (1877–1924) was an employee of the Royal Court of Sweden and he has been named as an extramarital son of King Gustaf VI Adolf having grown up in a religious foster family. Olivebring went to the United States in 1945 where he and Einar Ekberg gained notoriety as a duo in a Christian genre. Later in Sweden he continued his singing career, often working with Göran Stenlund. He made a considerable number of records and toured the country. He belonged to the Swedish Pentecostal Movement and in the USA worked occasionally with Billy Graham's team.

1945–1974 he was married to Birgit Märta Johanna Olivebring (1914–1986) and from 1975 to Sonja Karlsson . He had two daughters. Olivebring died in Gothenburg.

== Selected discography ==
Unknown year of issue

- It Took a Miracle (Sharon, 78 rpm)
- Fyra sånger av Elsa Emanuelson (Celesta, single)
- Carl Olivebring (Word, LP)
- Joyful Melodies (Word, LP)
- I Sing with Joy and Gladness (Supreme, LP)
- Carl-Erik Olivebring (Cymbal, LP)

Known years of issue

- 1949 – How Great Thou Art – If I could pray like a child again (North Star, USA, 78 rpm)
- 1949 – The Lord is My Shepherd – Psalm 23 (Scottish melody); Jesus Will Walk with Me, H. Lillenas (North Star, 78 rpm)
- 1949 – A Memory (A. H. Ackley); I know a name, Haldor Lillenas (Quality, USA, 78 rpm)
- 1952 – Älskar du Herren Jesus? (Hemmets Härold, 78 rpm)
- 1952 – Skall det bli några några stjärnor stjärnor i kronan (Sharon, USA, 78 rpm)
- 1953 – Jag vet ej, hur Han gör det (Hemmets Härold, 78 rpm)
- 1955 – Jag har funnit den goda vägen (Hemmets Härold, 78 rpm)
- 1956 – Herren leder de sina framåt [Förlaget Filadelfia 78 rpm)
- 1958 – Ingen dig förstår som Jesus (Hemmets Härold, single)
- 1958 – Julklockornas hälsning (Hemmets Härold, single)
- 1959 – Ljuva hemland (Hemmets Härold. single)
- 1960 – Jag känner ett namn (Hemmets härold, single)
- 1961 – Han viskar: "stilla, tyst" (Hemmets Härold, single)
- 1962 – Vart steg jag tar (Hemmets Härold, single)
- 1963 – Nu är jag nöjd och glader (Hemmets Härold, LP)
- 1964 – Tro på Gud. Sånger av Egon Zandelin (Frälsningsarmén, LP) one of many singers
- 1965 – Carl-Erik Olivebring och Gospelkören till orkester (Hemmets Härold, single)
- 1967 – O, jag ser en hvidklaedt skare / Rosenvinge, Anna (Hemmets Härold, single)
- 1967 – Carl-Erik Olivebring till trio (Hemmets Härold, single)
- 1969 – Carl E. Olivebring sjunger John W. Peterson (Hemmets Härold, LP)
- 1972 – 10 av våra favoriter på HH / Ekberg, Einar (Hemmets Härold, LP) with BirGitta Edström
- 1997 – Minns du sången (Viva, CD), one of many singers
- 1998 – Minns du sången : live from TV series (Viva, CD) one of many singers
- 2004 – Läsarsånger : recordings 1929–1953 (Hans Trädgårdh Records, CD) one of many singers

== Bibliography ==
- En sjungande ambassadör (A Singing Ambassador), Carl-Erik Olivebring and Per Östlin, 1996, Marcus, Örebro ISBN 91-7999-047-9
