= Gabriel Moulin =

American photographer (1872–1945)

Charles Peter Gabriel Moulin (1872–1945) was an American photographer. He took architectural photographs of building exteriors and interiors as well as views of San Francisco. He also took photographs of people and performances at the Bohemian Grove and was official photographer for the Bohemian Club. he photographed illustrator Harrison Fisher, sculptor Arthur Putnam, Edgar Stillman Kelley, James Thurber, and botanist Luther Burbank. His photographs are part of collections at The Bancroft Library of the University of California, Berkeley, the Oakland Museum of California, San Francisco Maritime National Historical Park and the San Francisco Museum of Modern Art.

Moulin was born in San Jose and moved to San Francisco with his family when he was eight. He worked for photographers Isaiah West Taber, Max Karras, and R. J. Waters. He photographed the 1894 California Midwinter International Exposition in San Francisco's Golden Gate Park.

Moulin Studios opened in 1909 and has continued for 3 generations. Moulin photographed the Metropolitan Club.

He photographed the aftermath of the 1906 San Francisco earthquake and the construction of the Golden Gate Bridge. He also photographed the Boulder Dam under construction, Portsmouth Plaza, and Pines Estate and members of the Bowles family in Oakland. He also photographed the Cordelia A. Culbertson House.

== Gallery ==
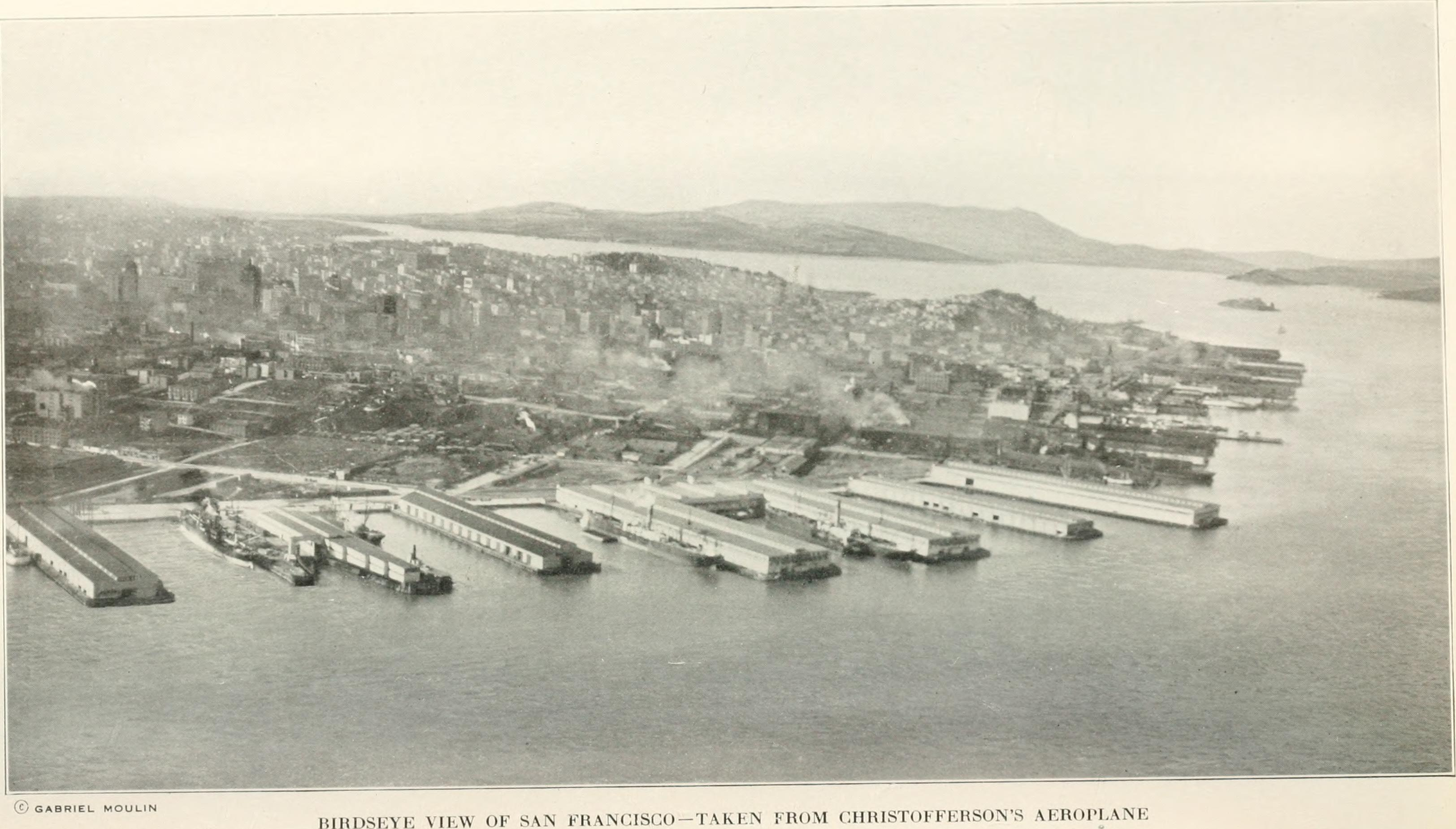
Aerial view of San Francisco

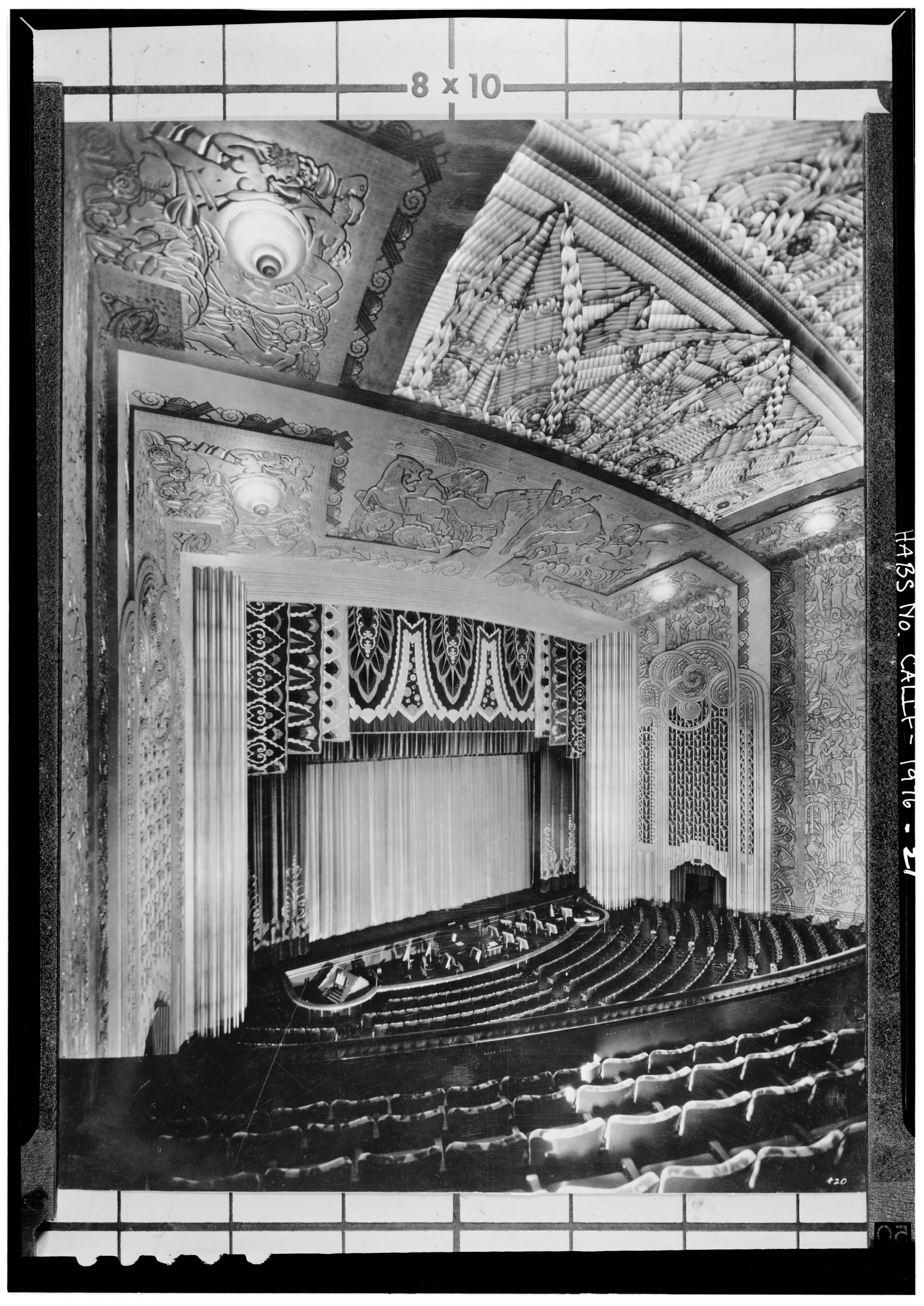
Paramount Theatre in Oakland, California

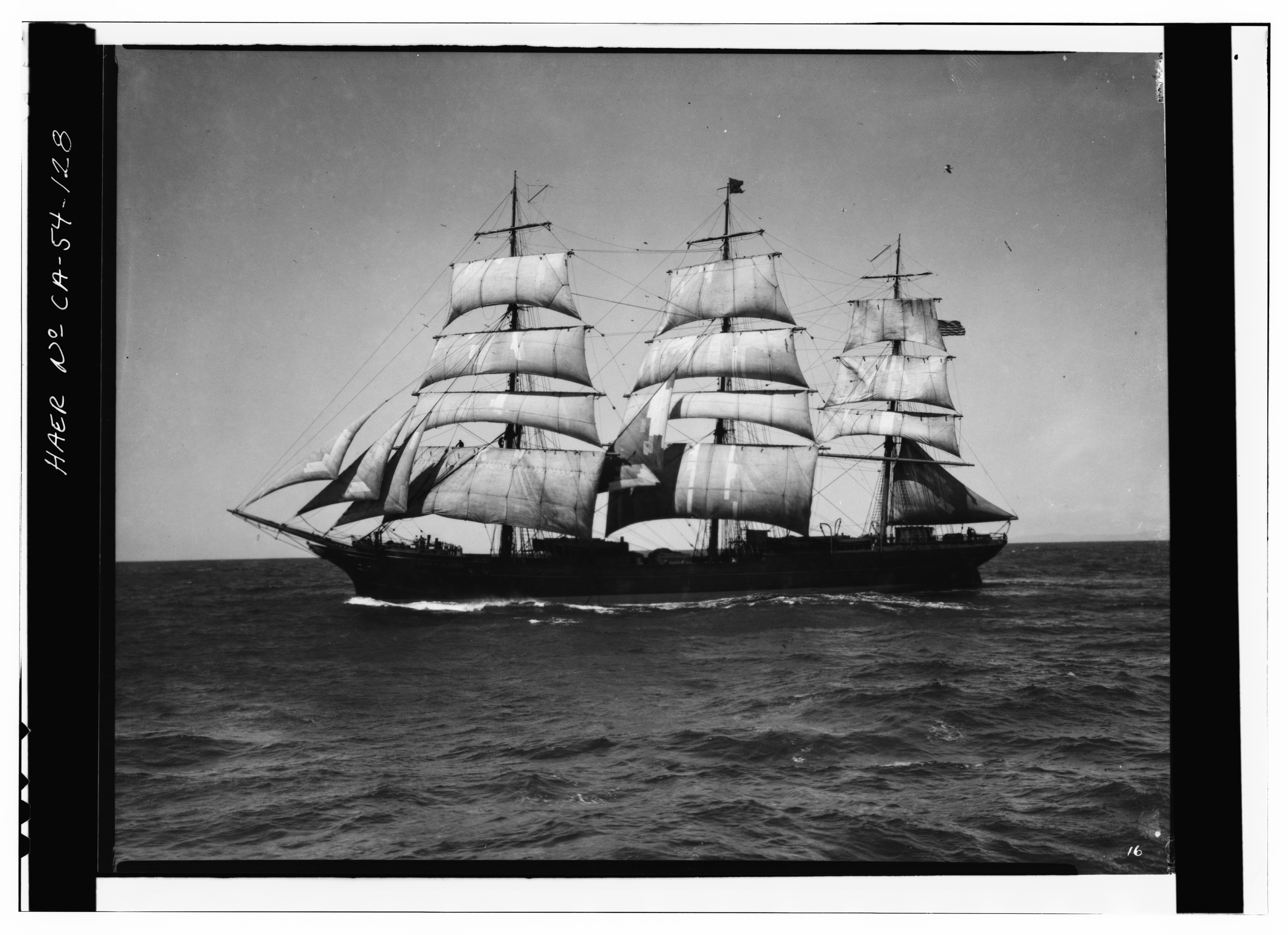
Balcutha under sail

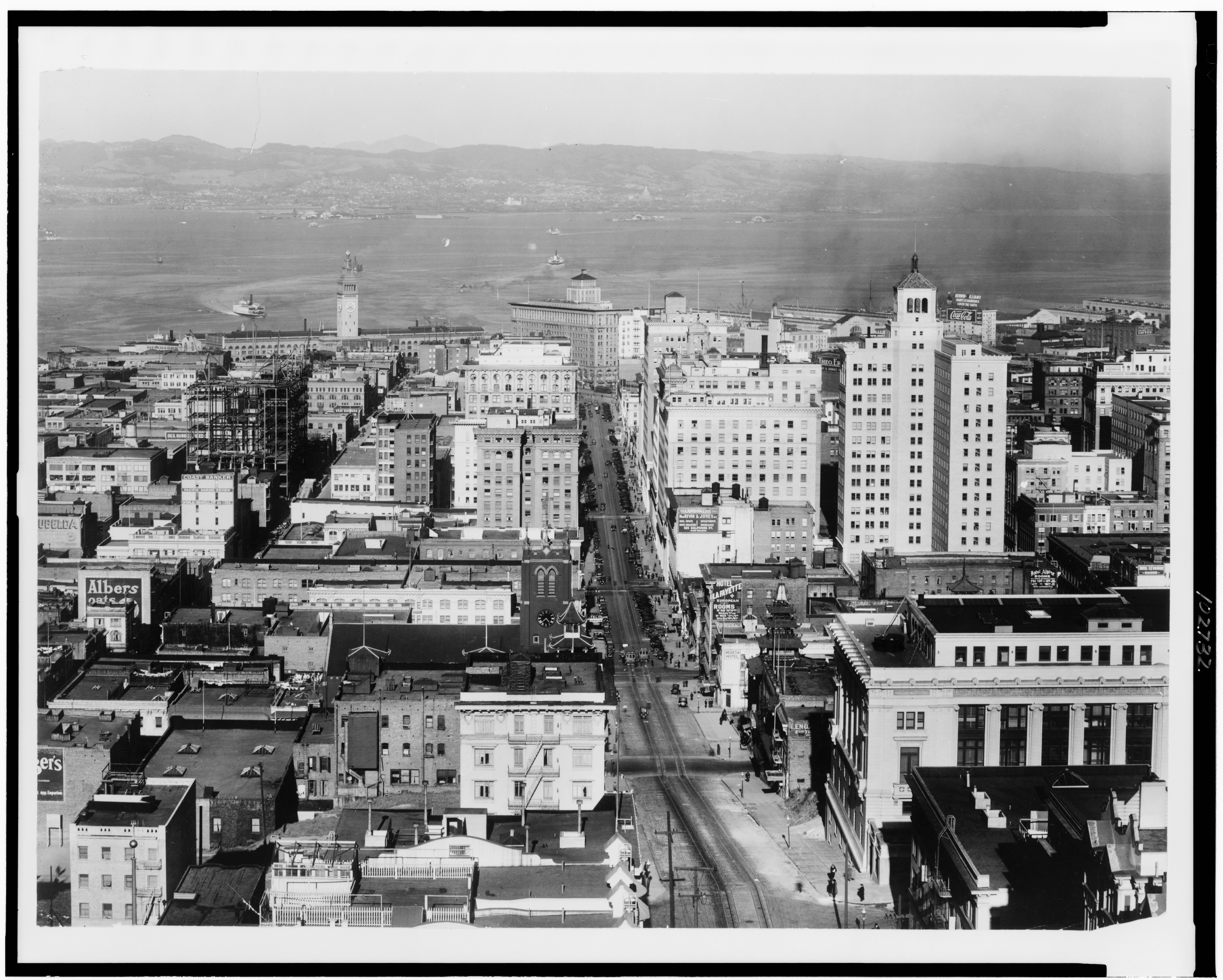
San Francisco's Business District, 1922

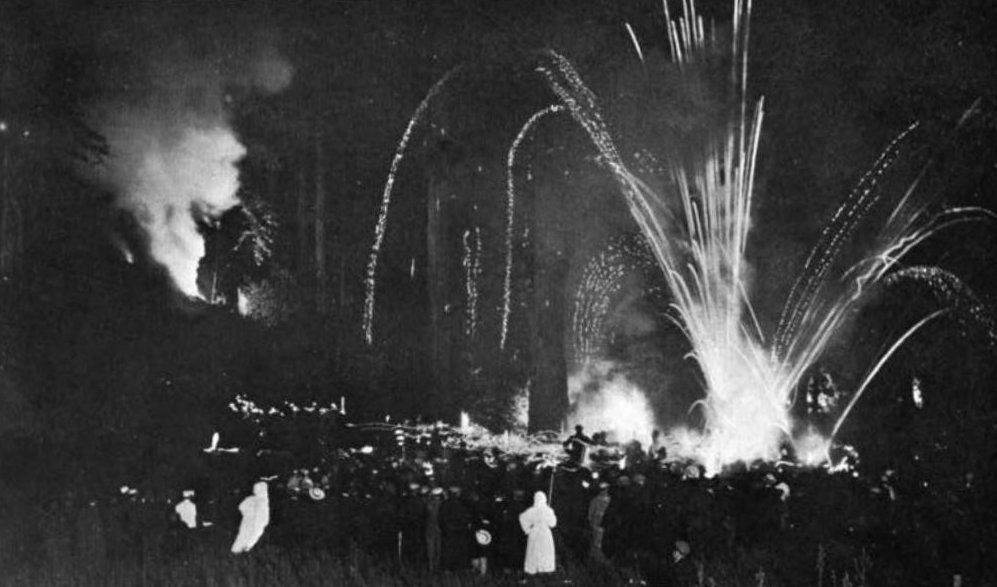
Cremation of Care ceremony at the Bohemian Grove, 1907

== Bibliography ==
- Our Bridges: Golden Gate Bridge, San Francisco-Oakland Bay Bridge (1936)
- Gabriel Moulin's San Francisco Peninsula: Town & Country Homes, 1910–1930 (1985)
