= Samuel Marsden Brookes =

American painter

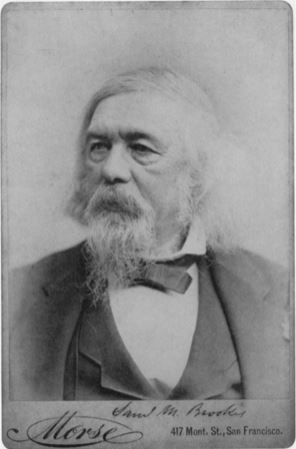
Samuel Marsden Brookes (1880s)

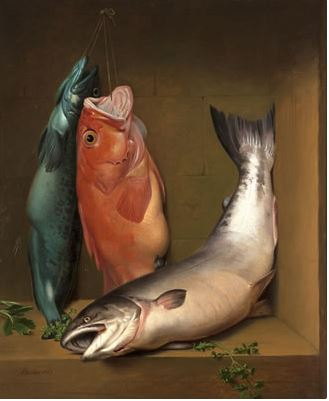
Still-life with Lingcod, Red Vermilion and Salmon

Samuel Marsden Brookes (8 March 1816, Newington Green, Middlesex – 31 January 1892, San Francisco) was an English-born American painter. He specialized in still lifes of fish and game, but began as a portrait painter and also produced some landscapes. He was also a member of the Bohemian Grove.

== Biography ==
He was born to a wealthy family of Dutch origin. His father, a botanist, managed a large nursery for exotic plants, in London. In 1833, his family emigrated to the United States, seeking to establish himself as an independent nurseryman, and settled near what was then the new city of Chicago.

As a teenager, he developed an interest in art; copying works from the travelling portrait artists and producing his own miniatures. Despite his talent, his father did not approve of art as a profession. Nevertheless, he took some drawing lessons from James Bowman and, in 1841, became an itinerant painter. Soon after, he married Julia Jones (1825–1898), whom he met in Milwaukee. By 1845, he had saved enough money to travel back to England, where he copied the Old Masters at all the London galleries. He had planned to stay for three years and visit Italy, but his wife and children implored him to come home after only one. By the time he returned to America, he was accomplished enough to attract clients from a higher income bracket and established himself in Wisconsin, near his wife's family. While there, he did several works on commission from the Wisconsin State Historical Society. He also bought a small farm.

In 1851, Gideon Denny, a maritime artist from San Francisco, heard about Brookes from Brookes' sister-in-law, who had moved there in 1850, and went to study with him. He was there for six years and convinced Brookes that San Francisco would be a better place for him. Accordingly, at the first opportunity, in 1862, he went there, liked what he saw and decided to stay. As soon as Julia could arrange the sale of their properties, she and the children followed and they settled in the Mission District. He and Denny shared a studio for many years. Later, he shared a studio with Edwin Deakin. He also took students; among them, William Keith.

In 1865 he helped organize the California Art Union. Later, he was elected vice president of the San Francisco Art Association and was a founder of the Bohemian Club. At some point not long after his arrival, he had given up portraits in favor of still lifes, for which he is now much better known. Fish were a favorite subject and he caught most of them in person. Some of his works were commissioned by Edwin B. Crocker and Mary Hopkins Searles, the widow of Mark Hopkins. Many of his paintings were lost when the Mark Hopkins Institute of Art burned, following the earthquake in 1906.
