= Gideon Jacques Denny =

American painter

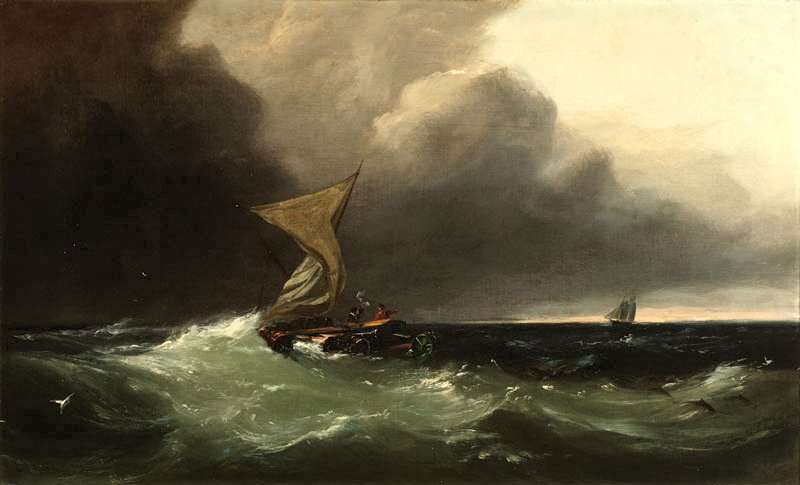
Shipwrecked figures signaling to a distant sailing ship, oil painting by Gideon Jacques Denny

Gideon Jacques Denny (1830–1886) was a marine artist who was born in Wilmington, Delaware on July 15, 1830. As a young man, he worked on ships in the Chesapeake Bay. He traveled to California in 1849 with the Gold Rush. He worked as a teamster on the San Francisco docks and was a member of the San Francisco Committee of Vigilance. After two years in California, he moved to Milwaukee, where he studied painting with Samuel Marsden Brookes. After six years of study in Milwaukee, Denny returned to San Francisco and established a studio on Bush Street. In 1862, Brookes moved to San Francisco and shared a studio with Denny. In 1868, Denny spent two months in Hawaii visiting several islands. He is also known to have visited Canada and South America. Denny died of malaria in Cambria, California on Oct. 7, 1886.

The Berkeley Art Museum and Pacific Film Archive, the Bishop Museum (Honolulu), the Crocker Art Museum (Sacramento, California), the Fine Arts Museums of San Francisco, Monterey Museum of Art, and the Oakland Museum of California are among the public collections holding works by Gideon Jacques Denny.
