= Edwin Deakin =

British-American painter (1838–1923)

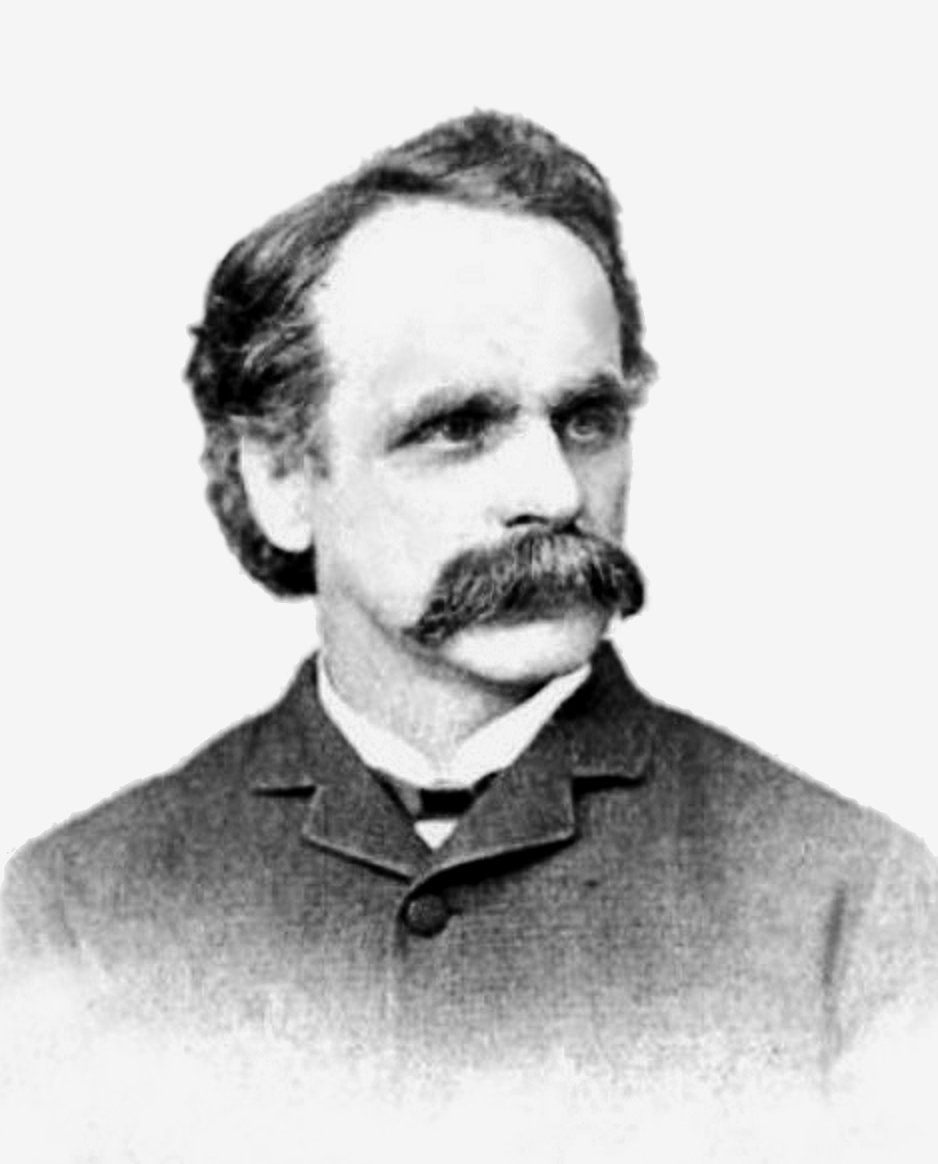
- Edwin Deakin c. 1899
- Born: May 21, 1838; Sheffield, Yorkshire, England
- Died: May 11, 1923 (aged 84); Berkeley, California, United States
- Known for: Fine arts painter - landscape, still life and architectural portraiture, oils on canvas
- Spouse: Isabel Fox

Edwin Deakin (May 21, 1838 – May 11, 1923) was a British-American artist best known for his romantic landscapes as well as his architectural studies, especially the Spanish colonial missions of California. His still lifes are considered to be some of the finest of the genre. Deakin is one of the artists who popularized scenes of San Francisco's Chinatown. His sensitive and highly publicized depictions of the deteriorating missions drew public attention to the necessity of restoring these historically important monuments.

== Life ==
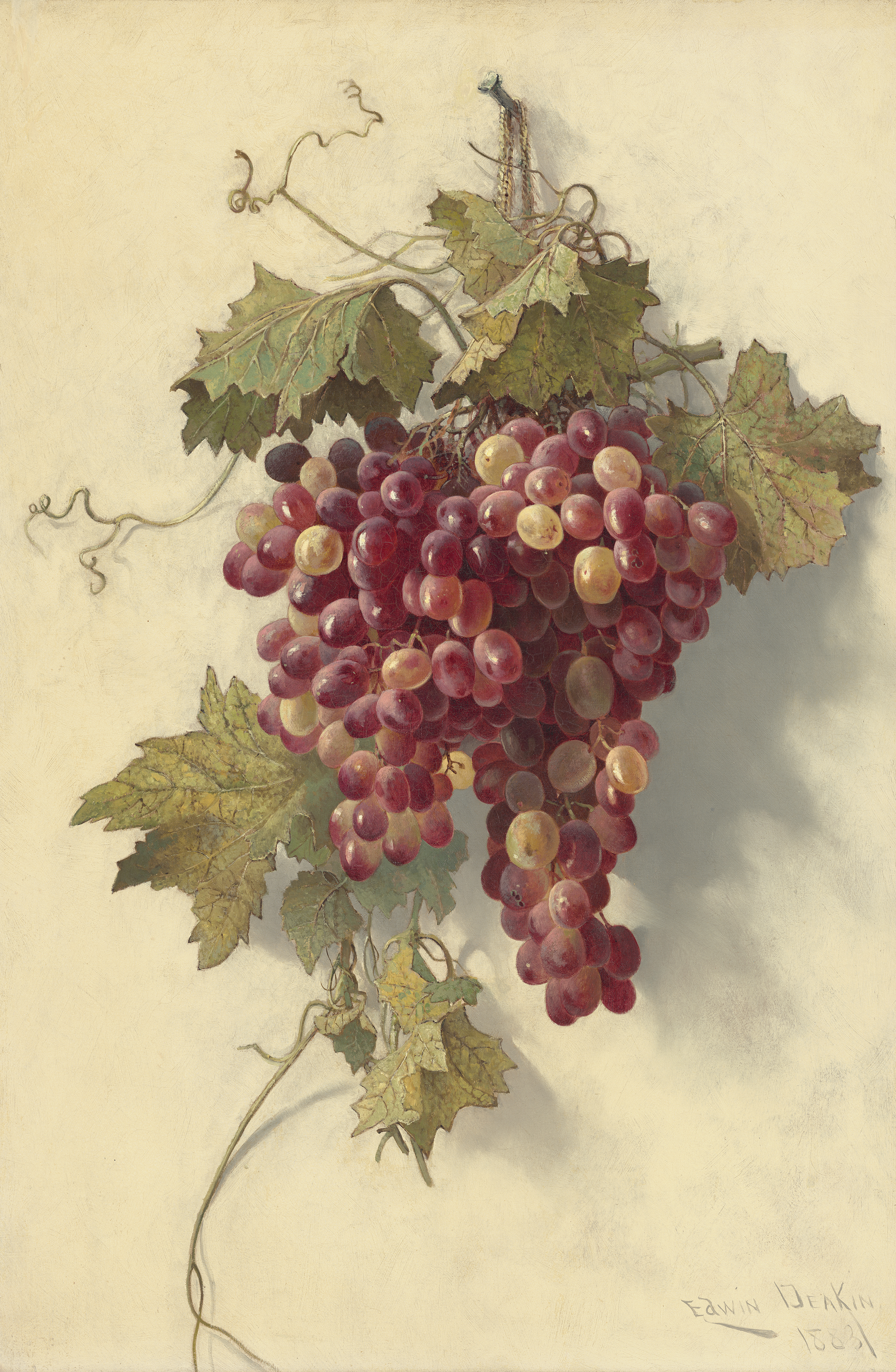
Grapes Against White Wall, 1883, National Gallery of Art.

Deakin was born in Sheffield, England, on May 21, 1838. He was apprenticed at the age of 12 to a business which painted landscapes and floral designs on furniture in the "Japanese style," but he received no formal training. By 18, he was a notable landscape artist. He emigrated to the US in 1856 with his family to the city of Chicago, where his father opened a hardware store and Edwin's occupation was listed in the Census as a "case maker." On June 21, 1865 Edwin Deakin married the 21-year-old Isabel Fox, also an emigrant from England. The following year saw the birth of their son Oscar Edwin Deakin, who became a talented painter, but died at the age of 30. The Deakins also had a daughter, Edna, who became an architect.

== San Francisco ==
Just prior to 1870 Edwin, along with his entire extended family, moved to San Francisco, California. He quickly established a successful career as a painter of the untamed California wilderness. Although he consigned his paintings to private commercial galleries and was a director and frequent exhibitor at the San Francisco Art Association (SFAA), he sold most of his canvases through public auctions. He became an exhibiting member of the Graphic Club and Bohemian Club. In 1874 he exhibited a Lake Tahoe scene at the Chicago Academy of Arts.

Three years later he left on a grand tour of Europe, where he painted primarily in England, France and Switzerland, and exhibited at the Paris Salon. He returned in May 1879 to San Francisco. The first showings of his new European paintings in San Francisco garnered much attention. He exhibited dozens of paintings to positive reviews at the California State Fair between 1879 and 1889. He traveled extensively through the Midwest and had prolonged stays in both Denver (1882–83) and Salt Lake City (1883). Deakin's highly publicized disputes with the "rebels" of the San Francisco art colony caused him to withdraw in 1885 as an exhibiting member of the SFAA. At this time his still lifes of pendulous grapes became extremely popular and were much imitated. During one of his several trips to New York City he published a series of articles which called for the standardization of canvas sizes, a common practice in Europe that allowed for the mass production of cheaper frames.

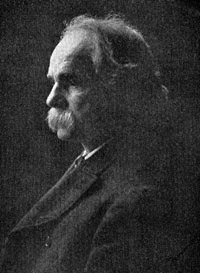
Edwin Deakin c. 1904.

== Berkeley ==
In 1891, Deakin moved with his wife and two daughters to the university town of Berkeley, just across the bay from San Francisco, where he built a large residence and studio-gallery. He soon began a tradition of holding an annual studio exhibit open to the public. Deakin still maintained a small sales office in San Francisco and continued to contribute his paintings to that city's auctions and private galleries. His one-man show in April 1900 at the Palace Hotel featured all of his 21 California Spanish mission paintings, many in elaborate iconographic frames designed by the artist himself. His campaign to save the missions was the subject of a highly laudatory article in the Washington, D.C. Herald.

Deakin exhibited frequently at public venues in Oakland as well as in Berkeley where he actively supported the creation of the Berkeley Art Association in 1907. He helped to design and decorate his brother's Studio Building in Berkeley, which became the first home for the California School of Arts and Crafts (today's California College of the Arts) and the professional address of many prominent artists, including Henry Joseph Breuer and Evelyn Withrow. His many depictions of the 1906 San Francisco earthquake and fire received great attention. He expanded his Berkeley gallery to maintain a permanent display of one of the three sets of his mission paintings and allowed the public to visit three days a week.

He was a British citizen at the time of his death on May 11, 1923.

== Publications ==
1966 saw the publication of A Gallery of California Mission Paintings by Edwin Deakin, edited by Ruth I. Mahood and produced by the staff of the History Division, Los Angeles County Museum of Natural History (W. Ritchie Press).

The monograph Edwin Deakin: California Painter of the Picturesque by Scott A. Shields (Petaluma, CA: Pomegranate) was published in 2008 to coincide with a Deakin exhibit at the Crocker Art Museum in Sacramento.

== Gallery ==
=== Works from the Crocker Art Museum, Sacramento ===
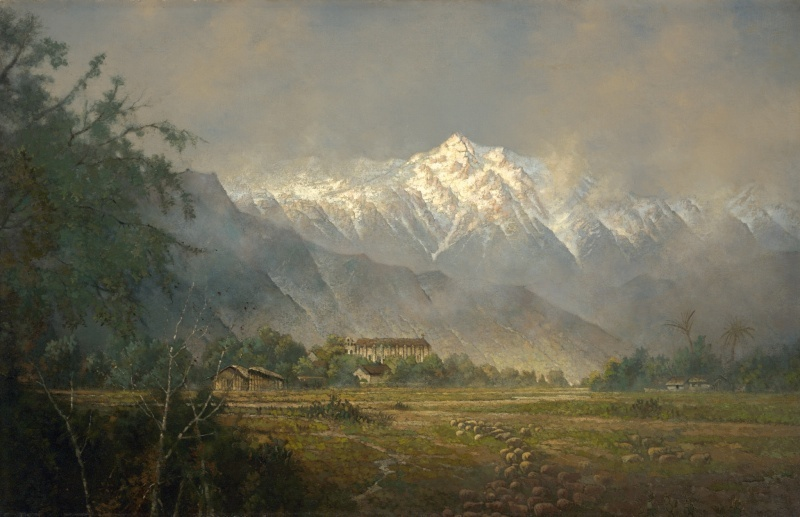
San Gabriel Mission, no date

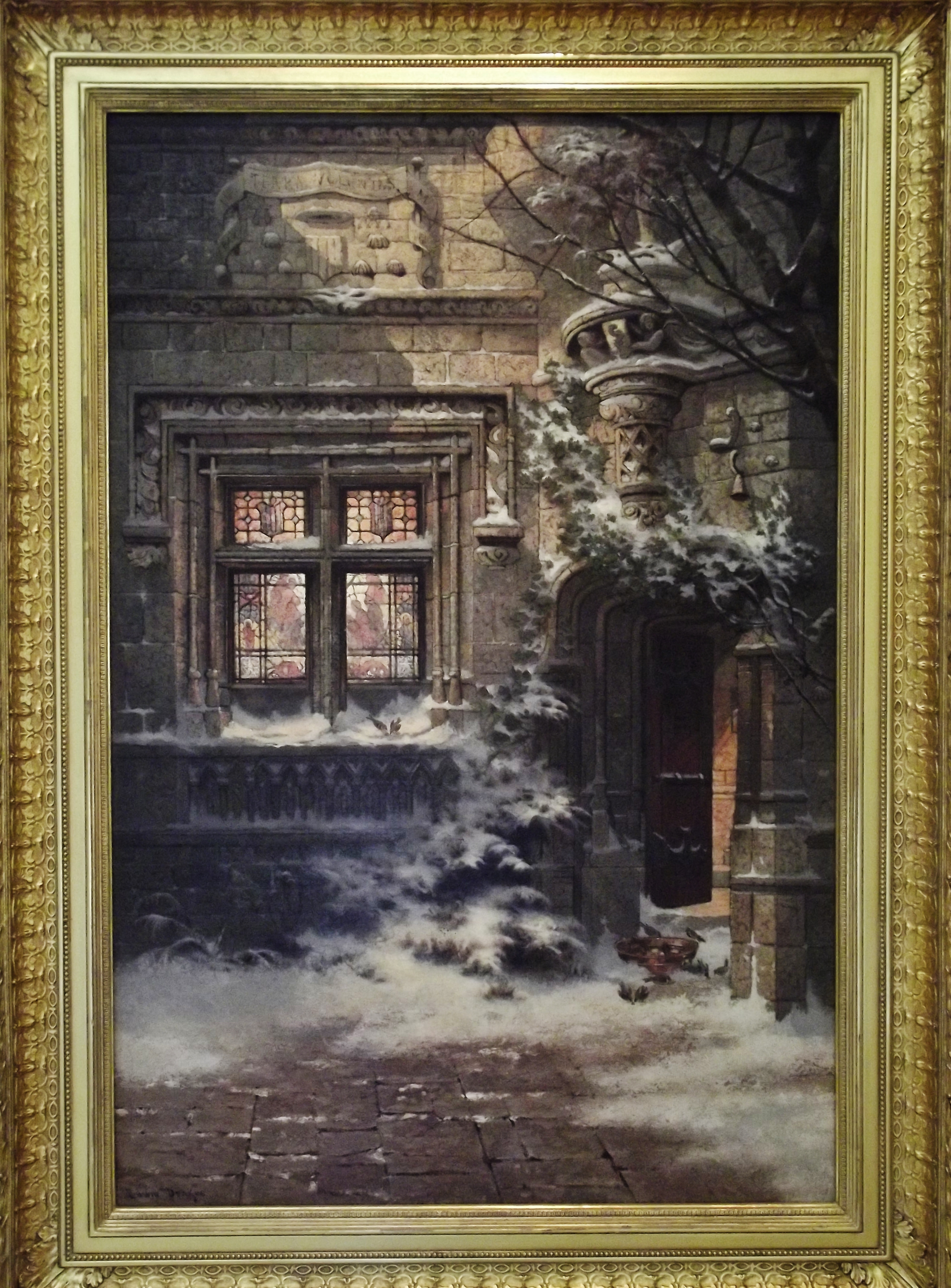
Christmas Morning, Hôtel de Cluny, no date

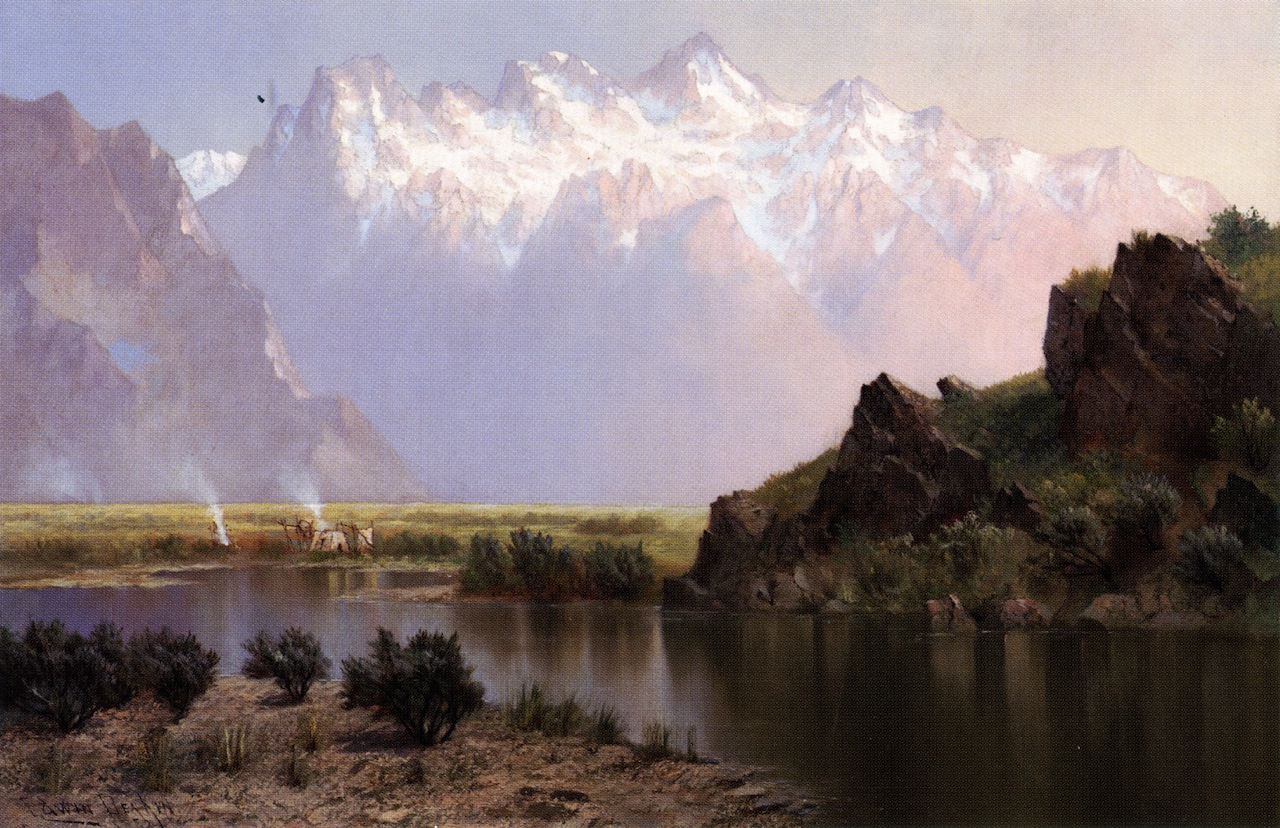
Humboldt Mountains, Ruby Range, Nevada, 1882

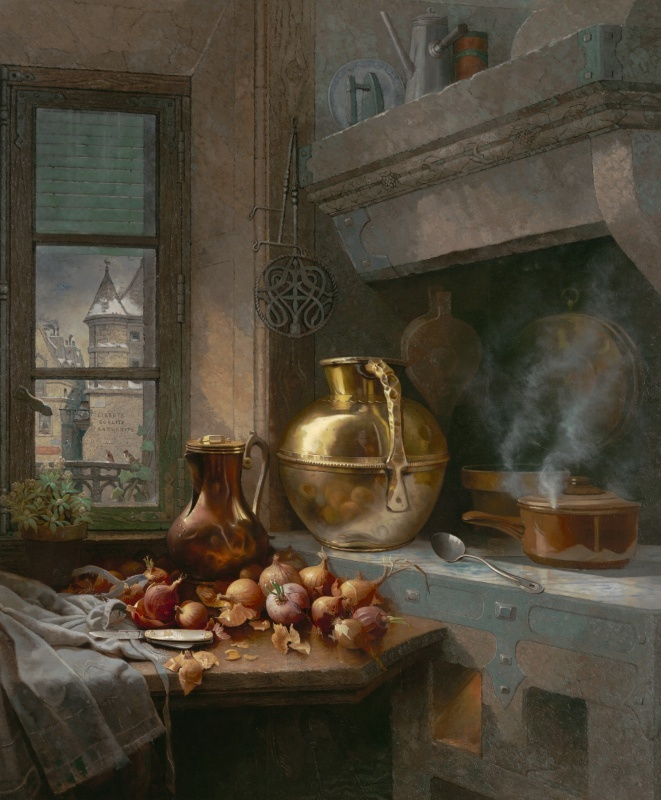
Le coin de Cuisine, 1883

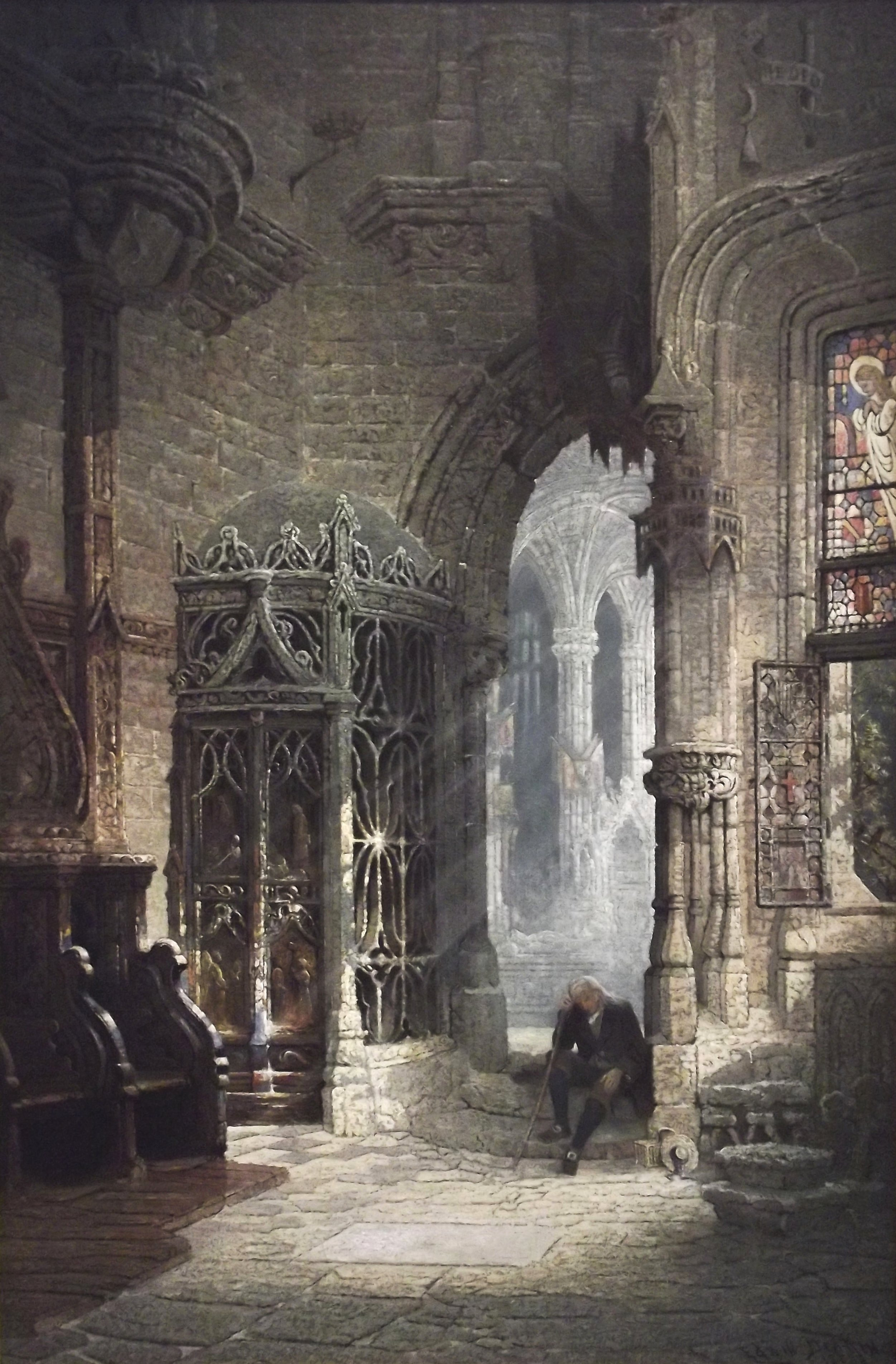
She Will Come Tomorrow, 1888

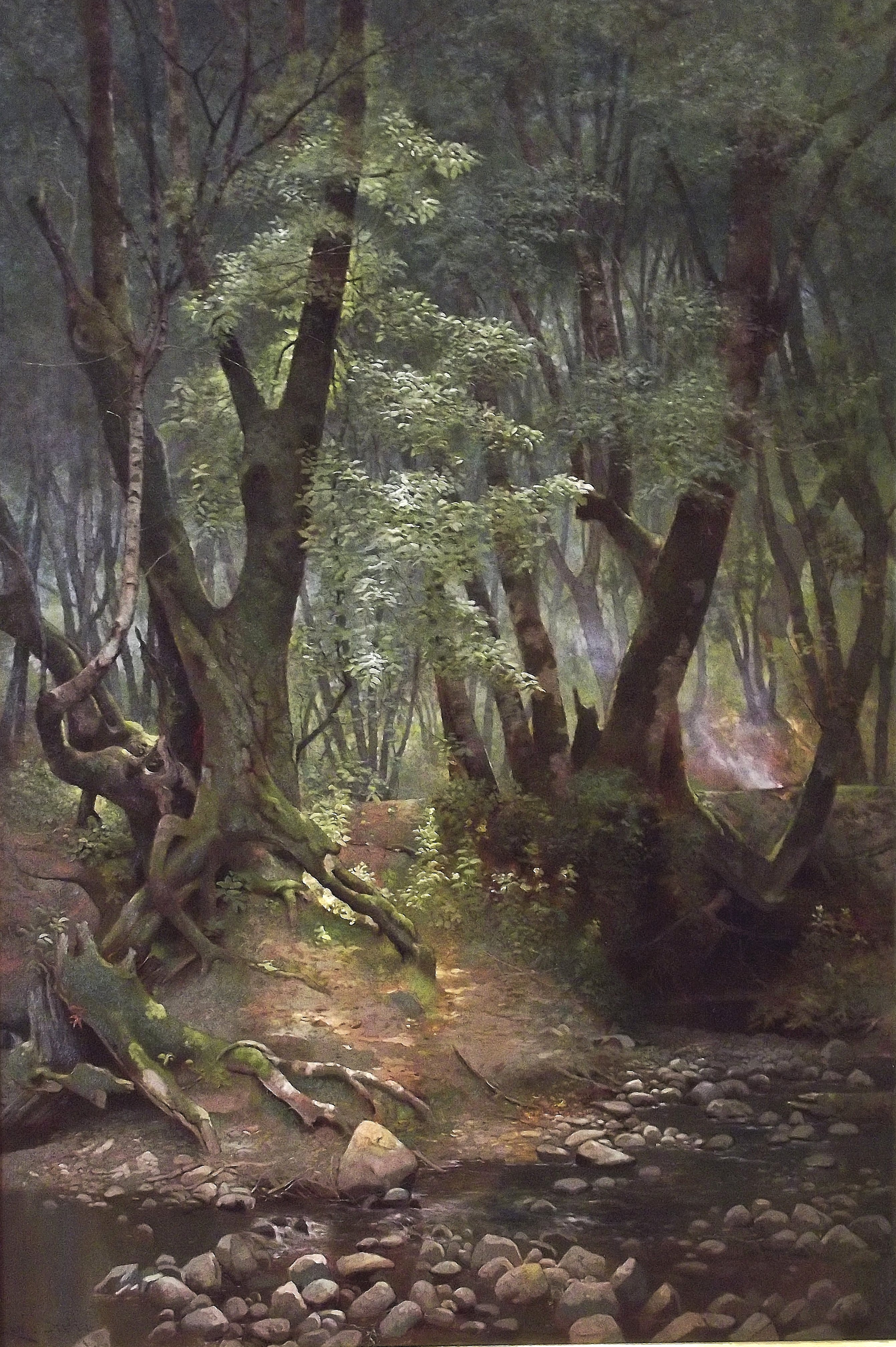
Strawberry Creek, Berkeley, 1892

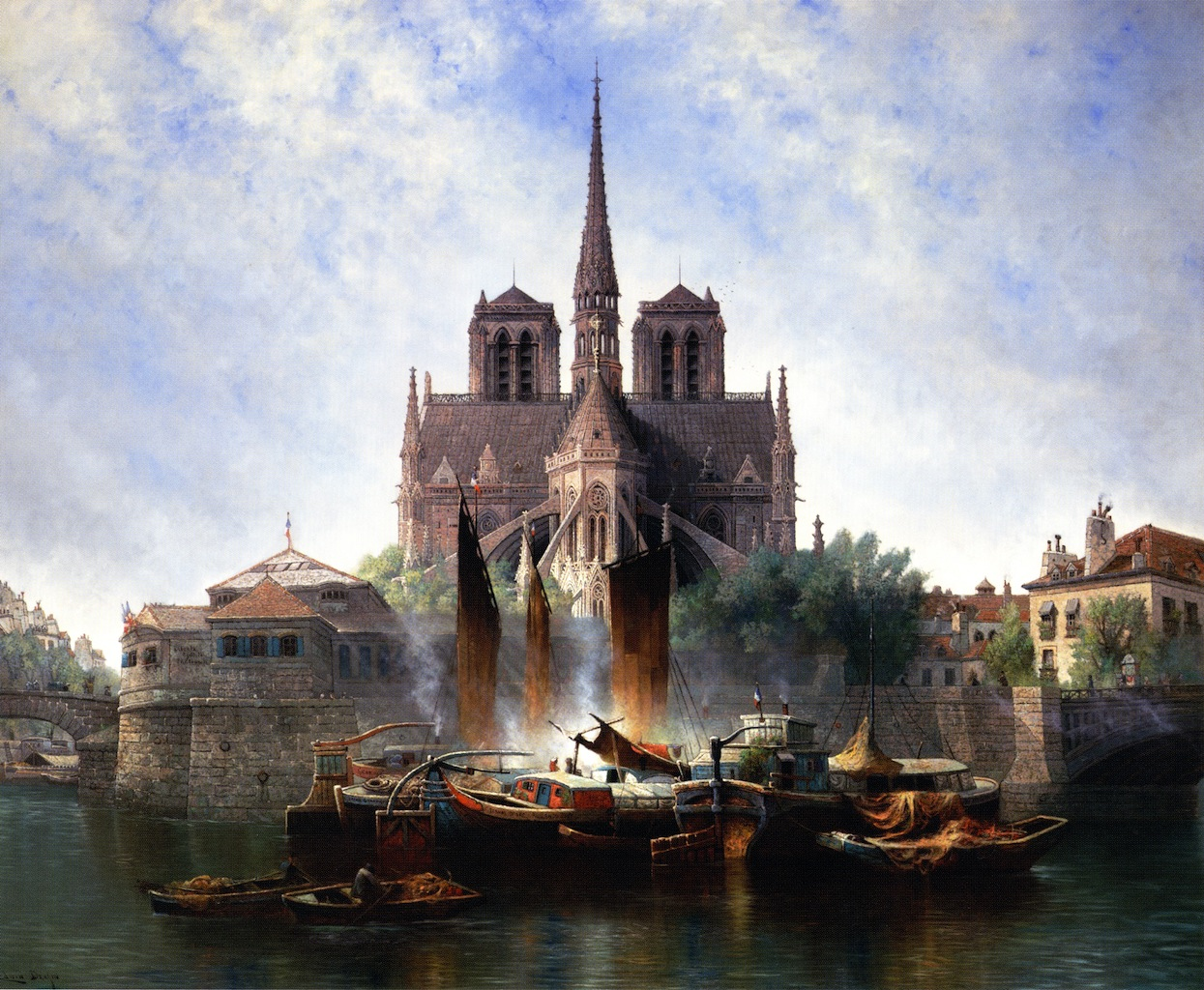
Notre Dame, Paris, 1893

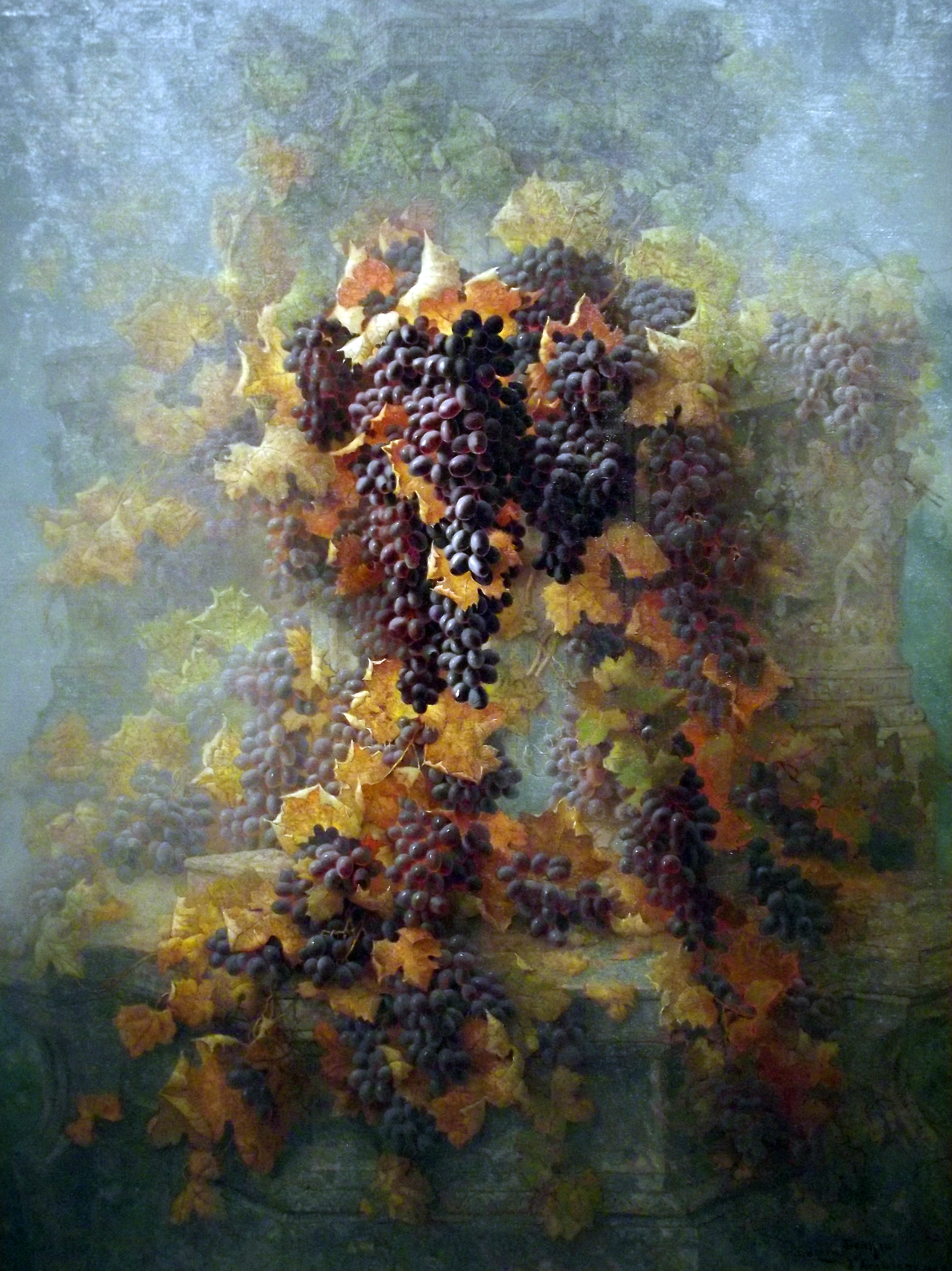
Grapes and Architecture, 1907

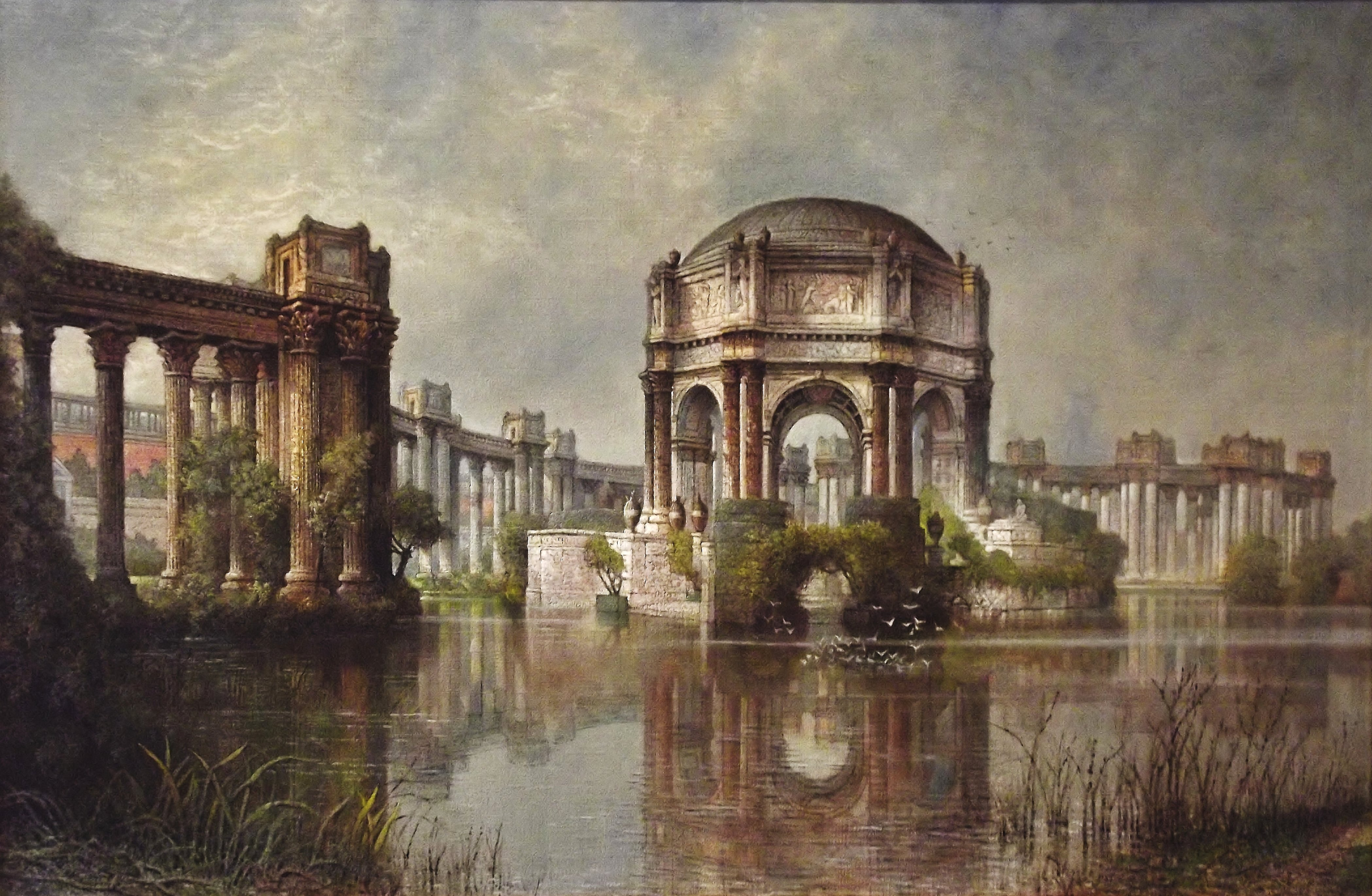
Palace of Fine Arts and the Lagoon, 1915

=== Works from the Oakland Museum of California ===
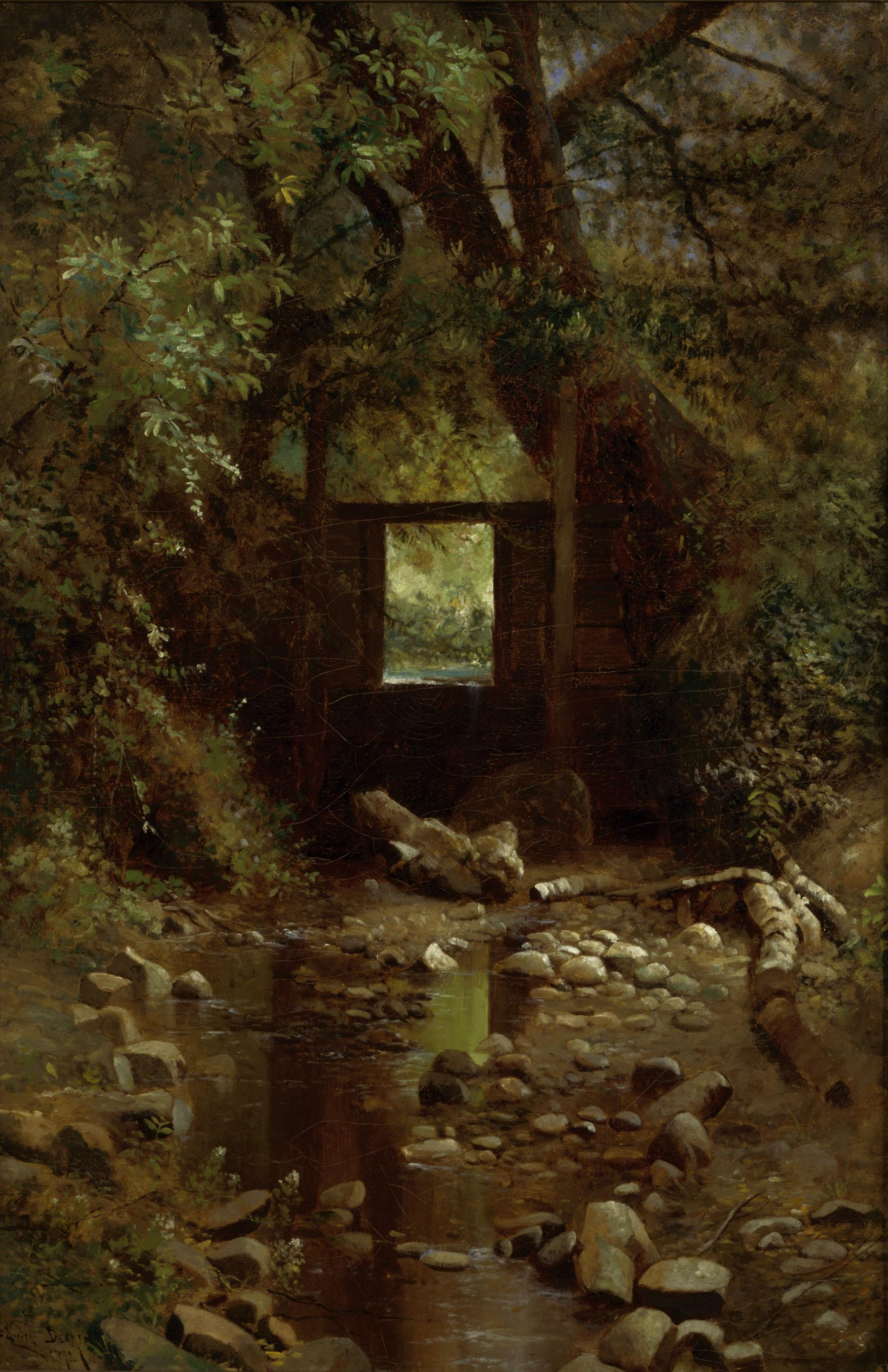
Outdoor Study on Strawberry Creek, 1892

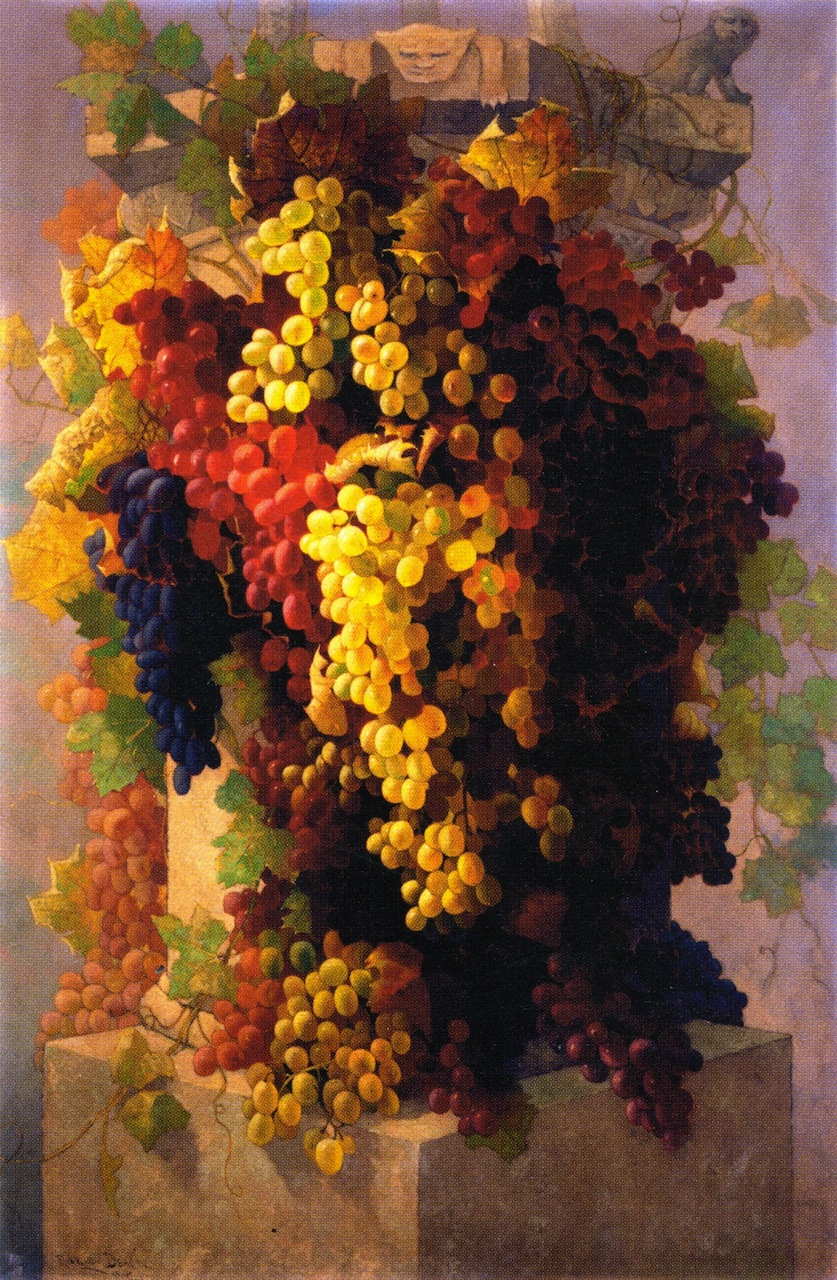
An Offering to Bacchus, 1892

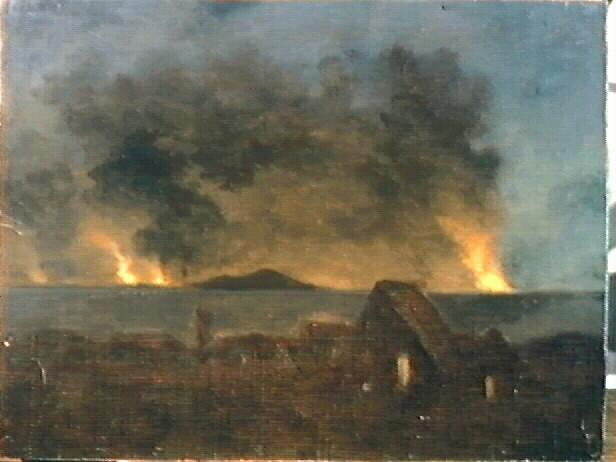
Sketch—San Francisco Fire, 1906

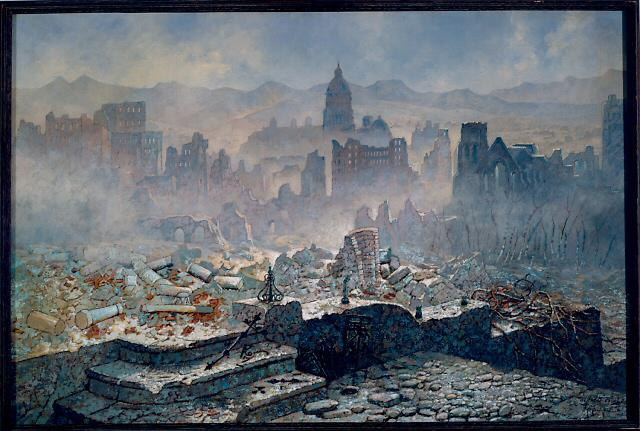
Despair, 1906

=== Works from the De Young Museum, San Francisco ===
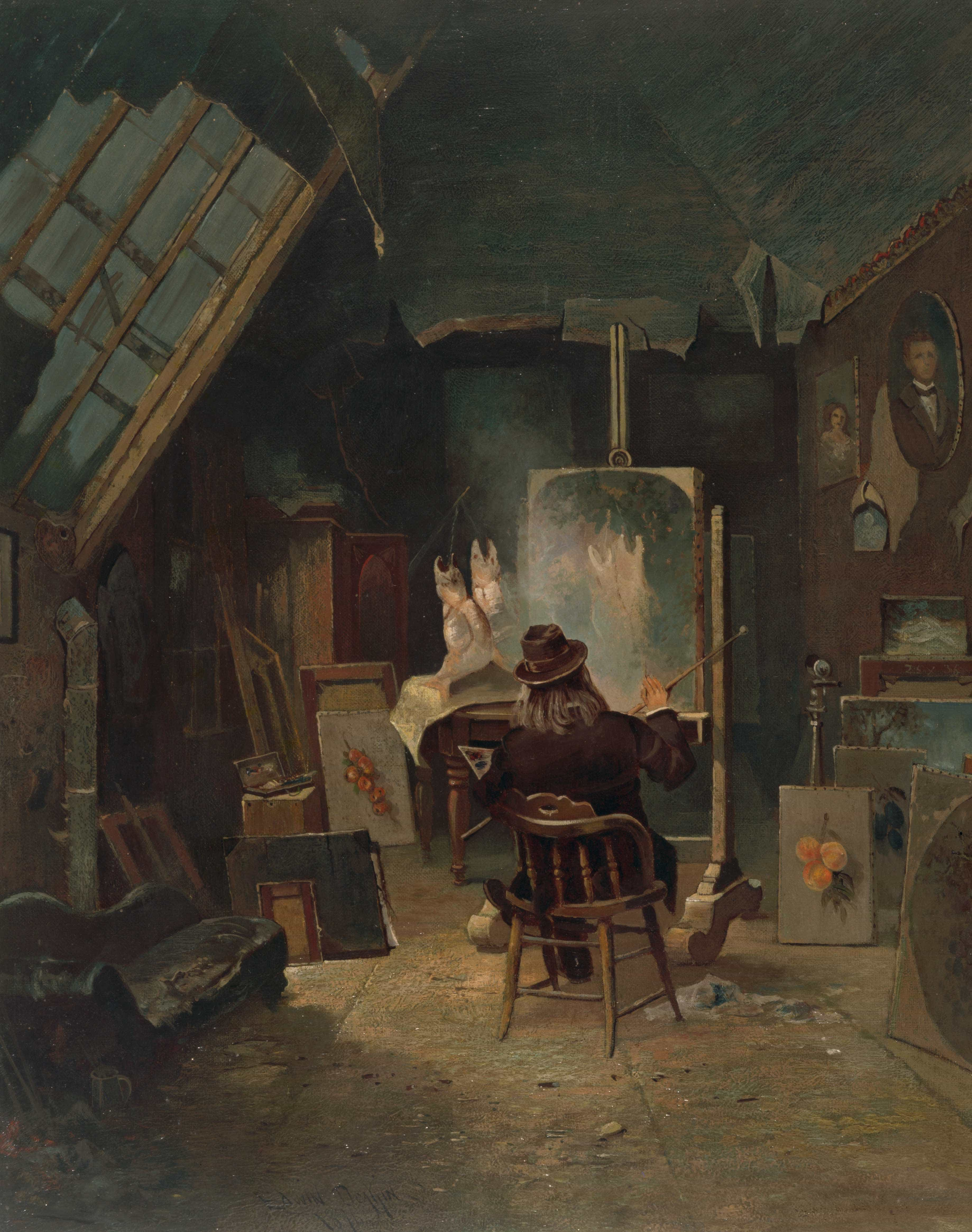
Samuel Marsden Brookes in His Studio, 1876

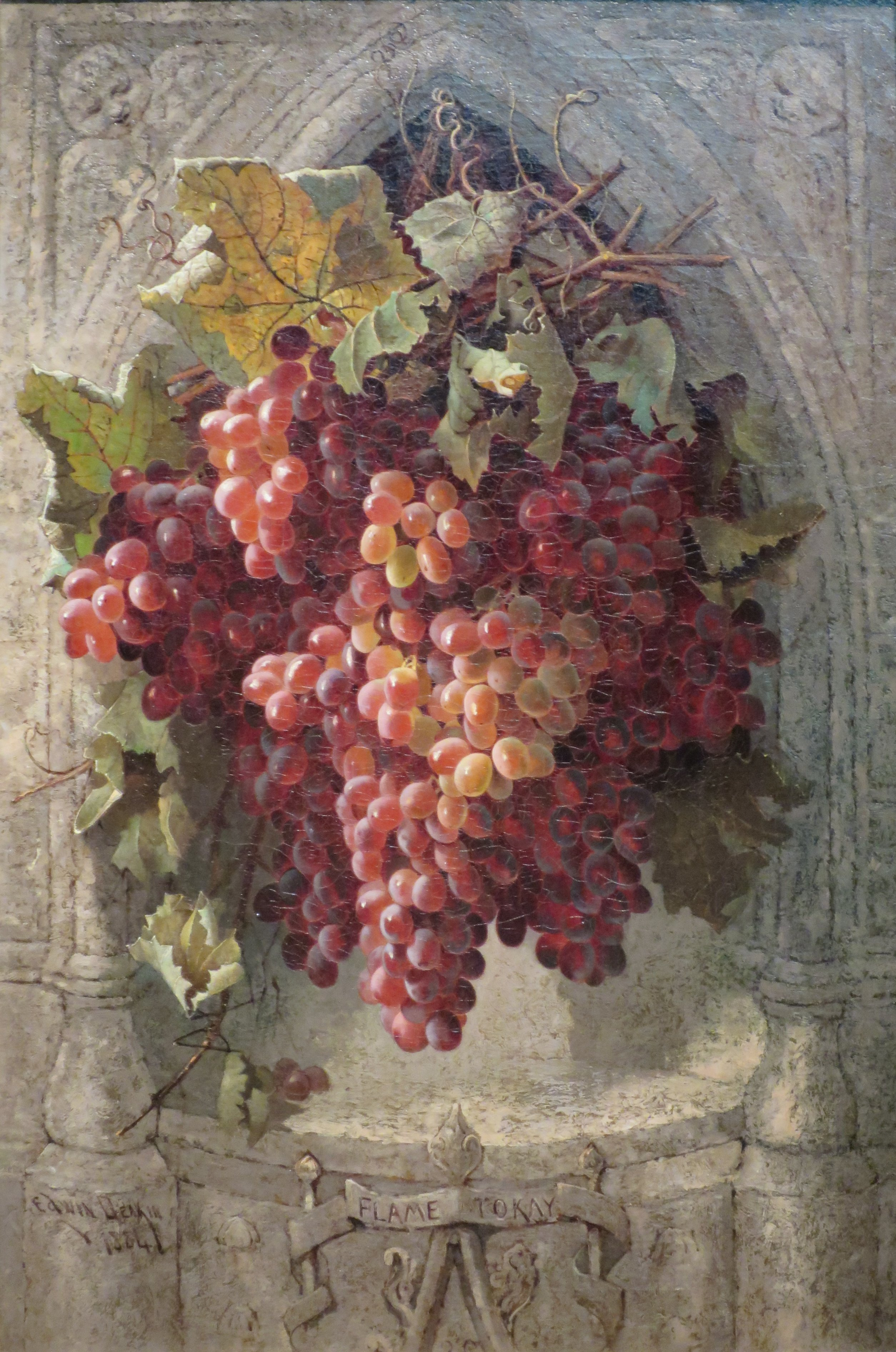
Flame Tokay Grapes, 1884

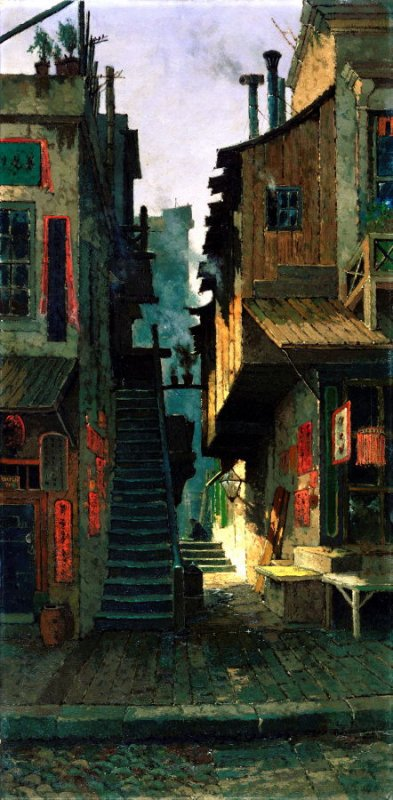
Court in Chinatown, San Francisco, 1886

=== Elsewhere ===
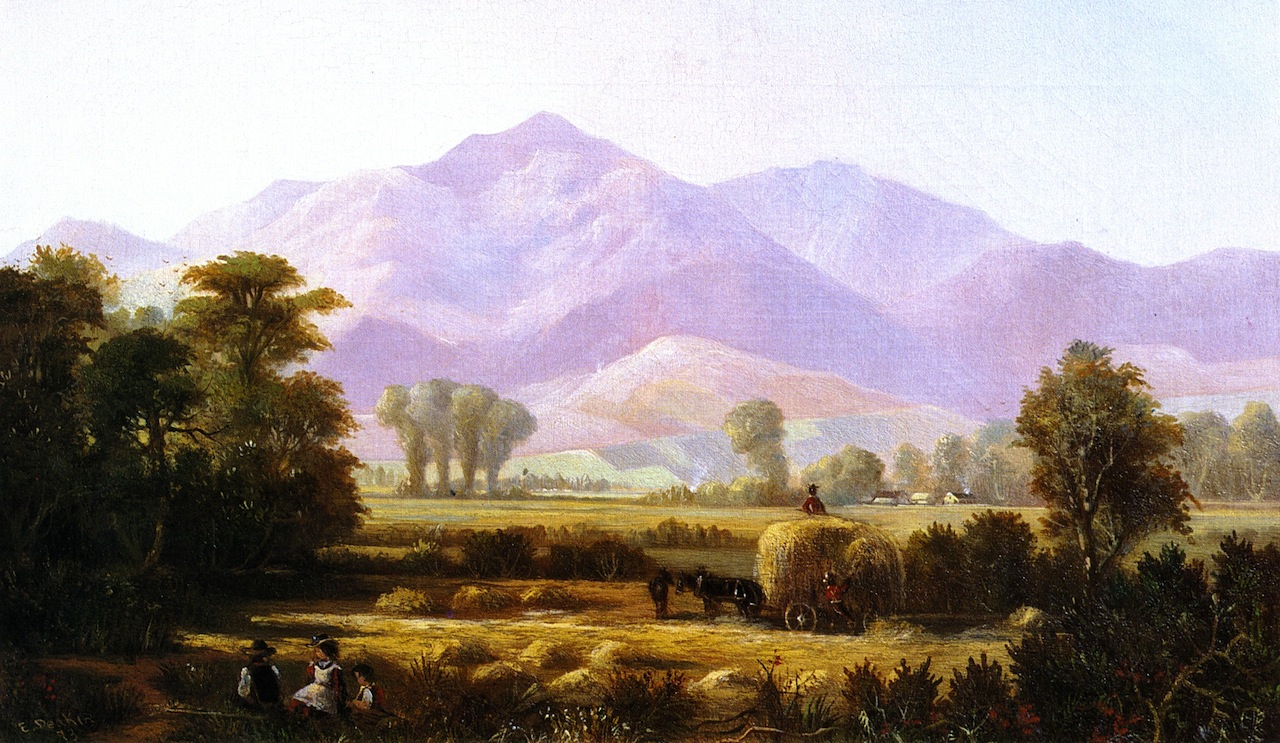
Mount Diablo from near Pleasanton, no date, private collection

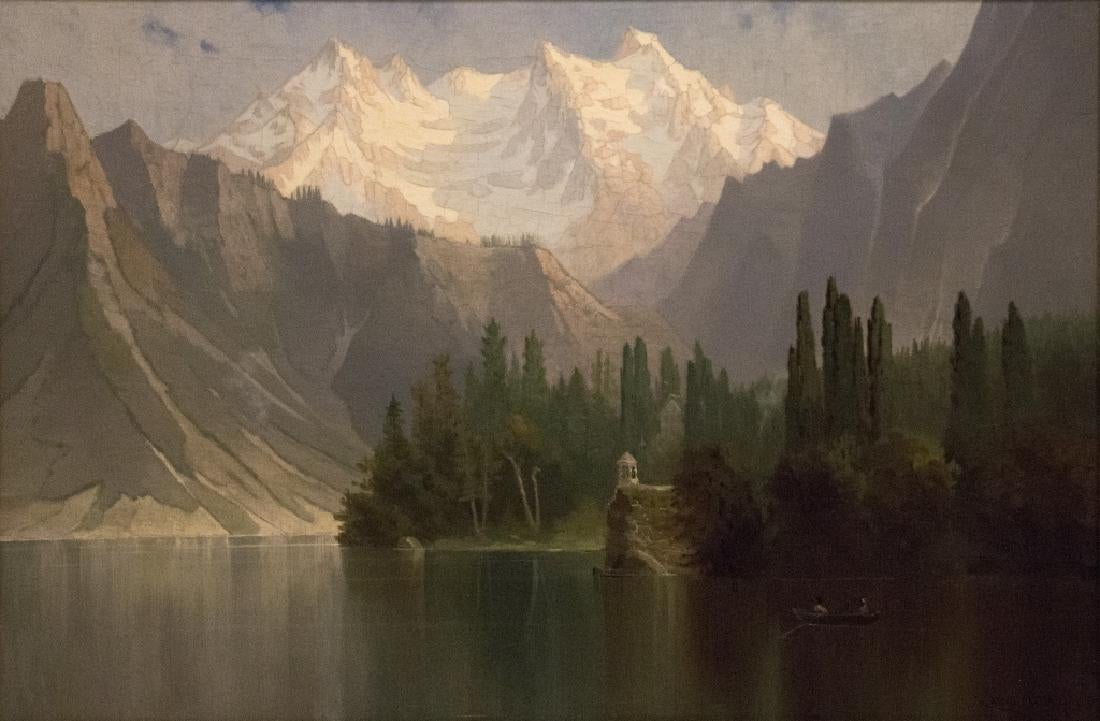
Mt. Tallac, Lake Tahoe, no date, private collection

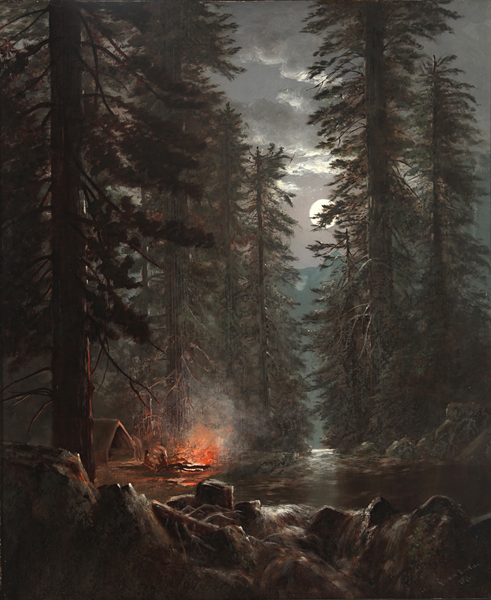
Campfire in the Redwoods, 1876, Laguna Art Museum

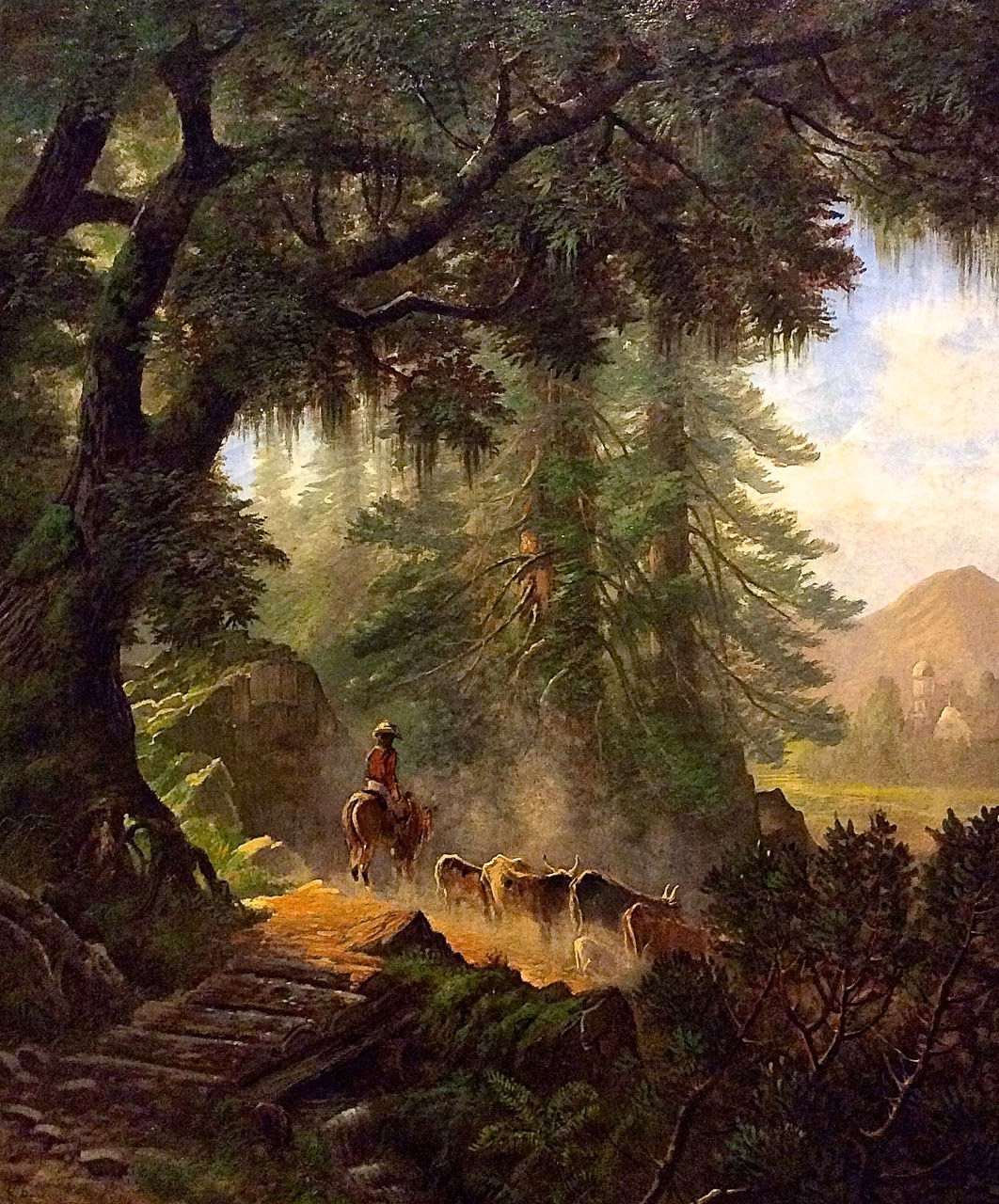
Cattle Drive Near the Mission, 1876, private collection

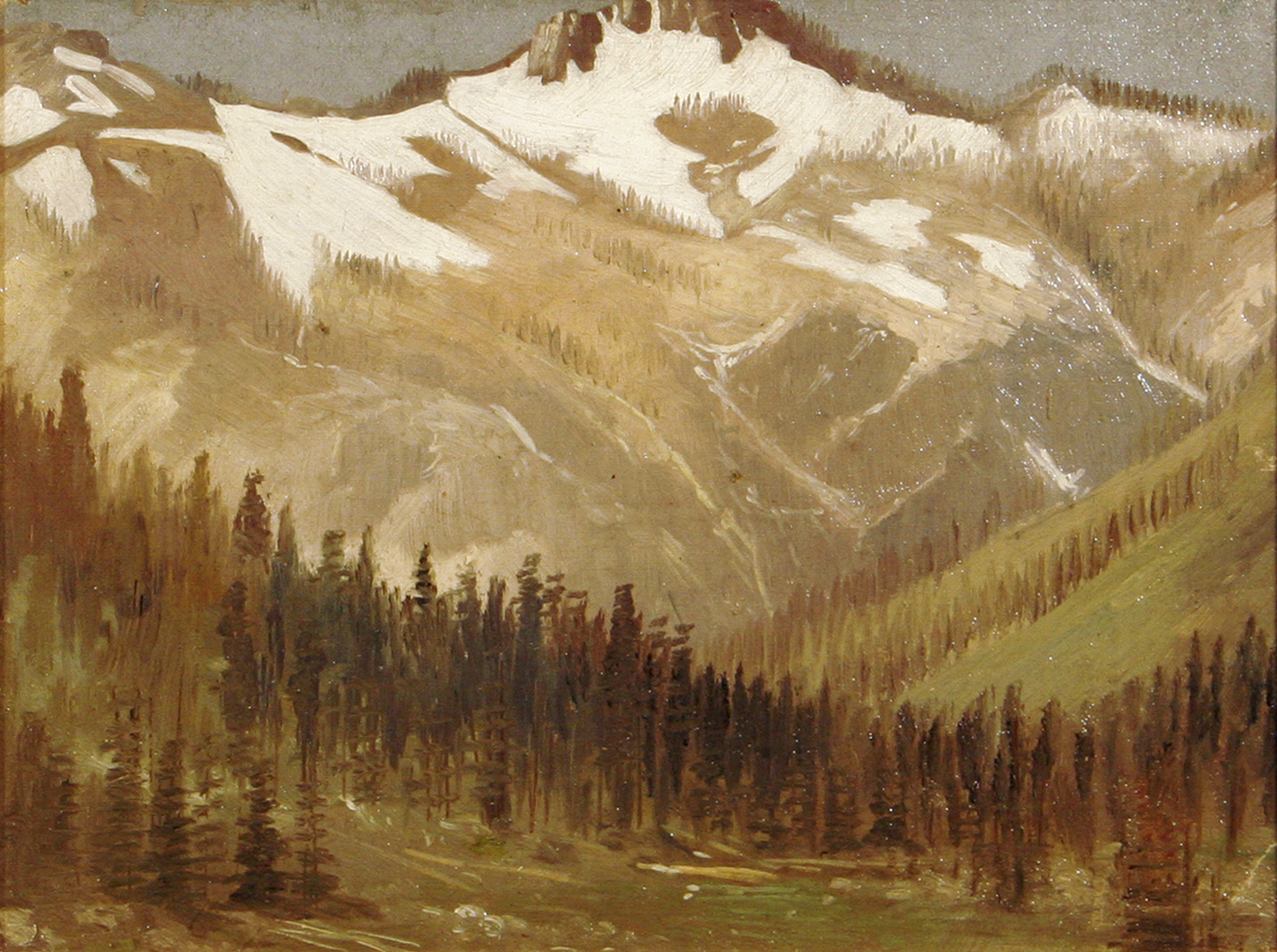
Truckee River Region, 1880, Nevada Museum of Art

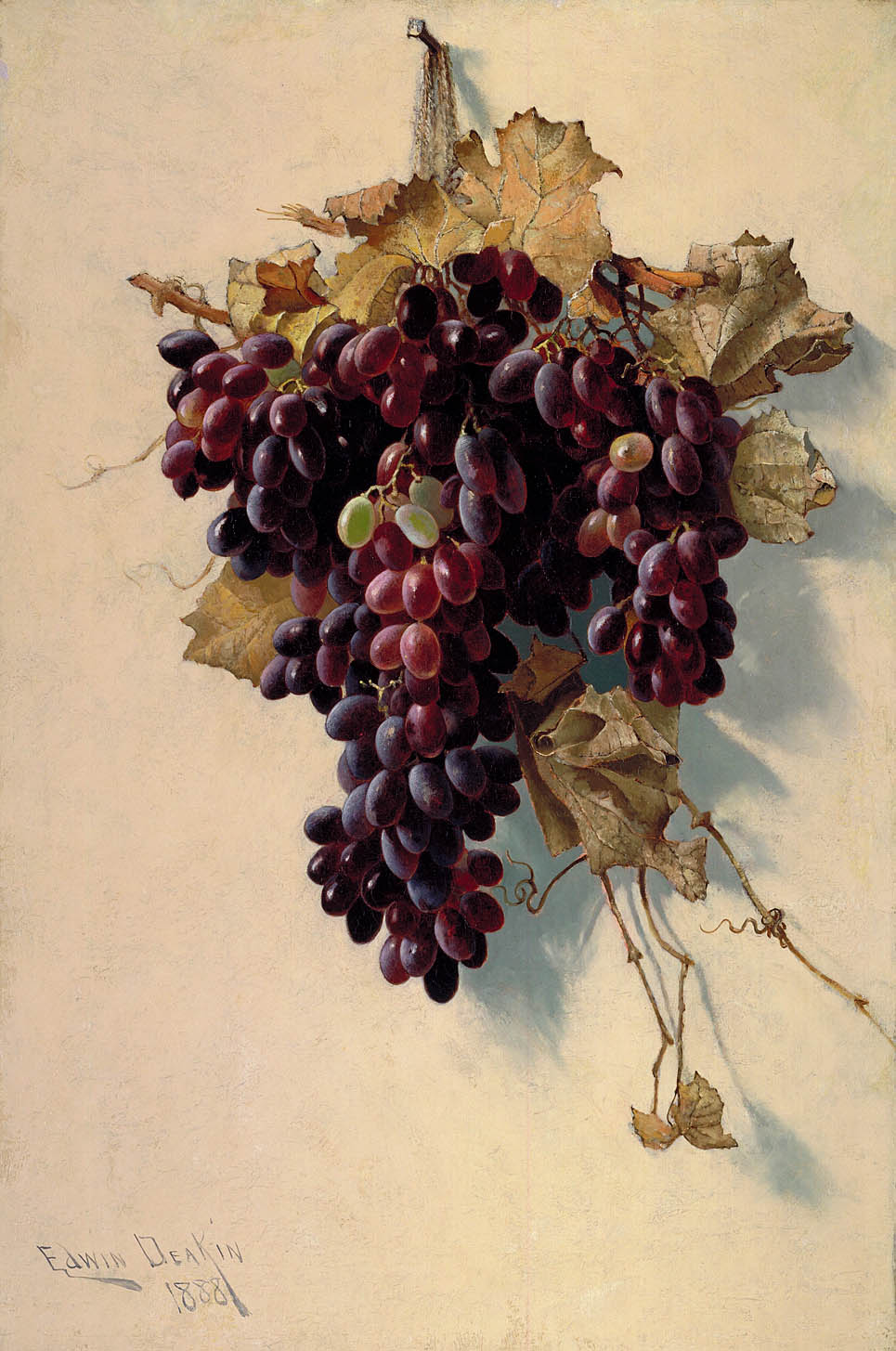
Still Life with Grapes, 1888, Smithsonian American Art Museum

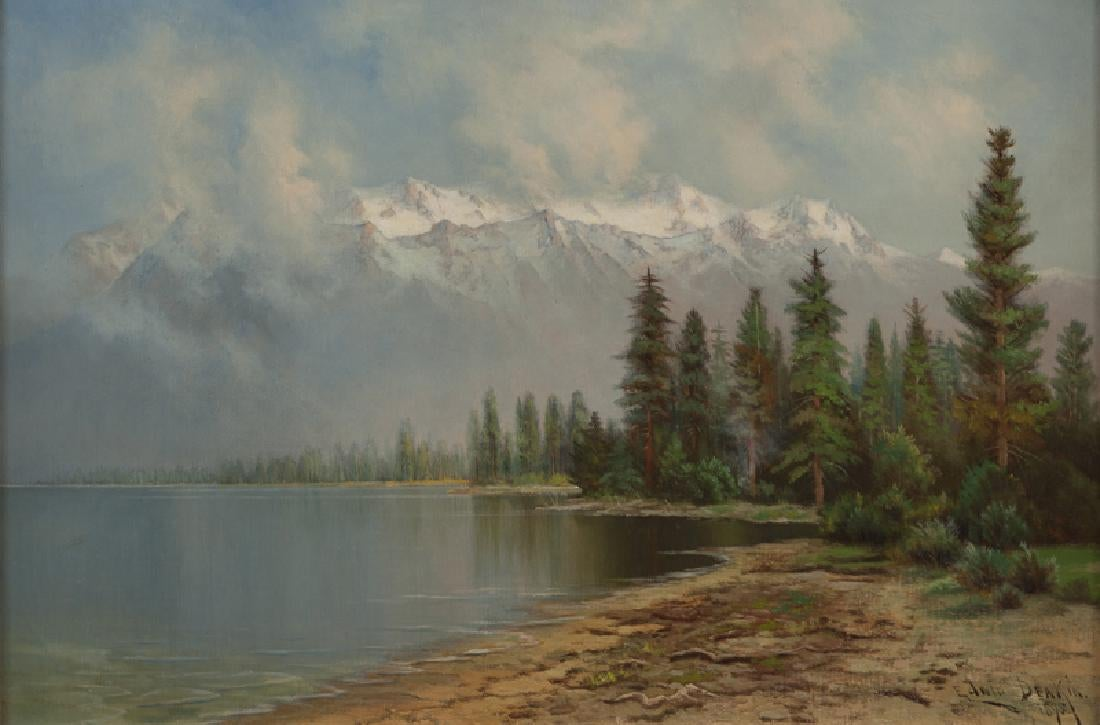
Lake Tahoe from near the Little Truckee, 1895, private collection

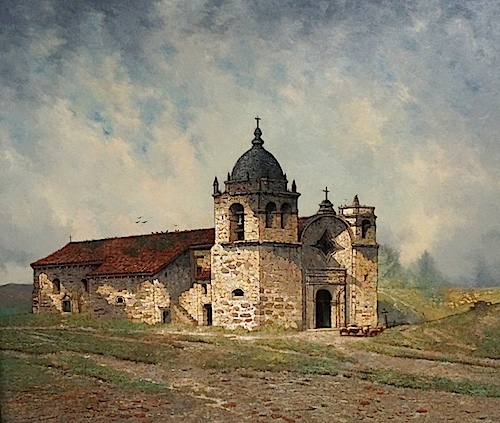
Mission San Carlos Borromeo del Rio Carmelo, c. 1897, Santa Barbara Mission Archives Library

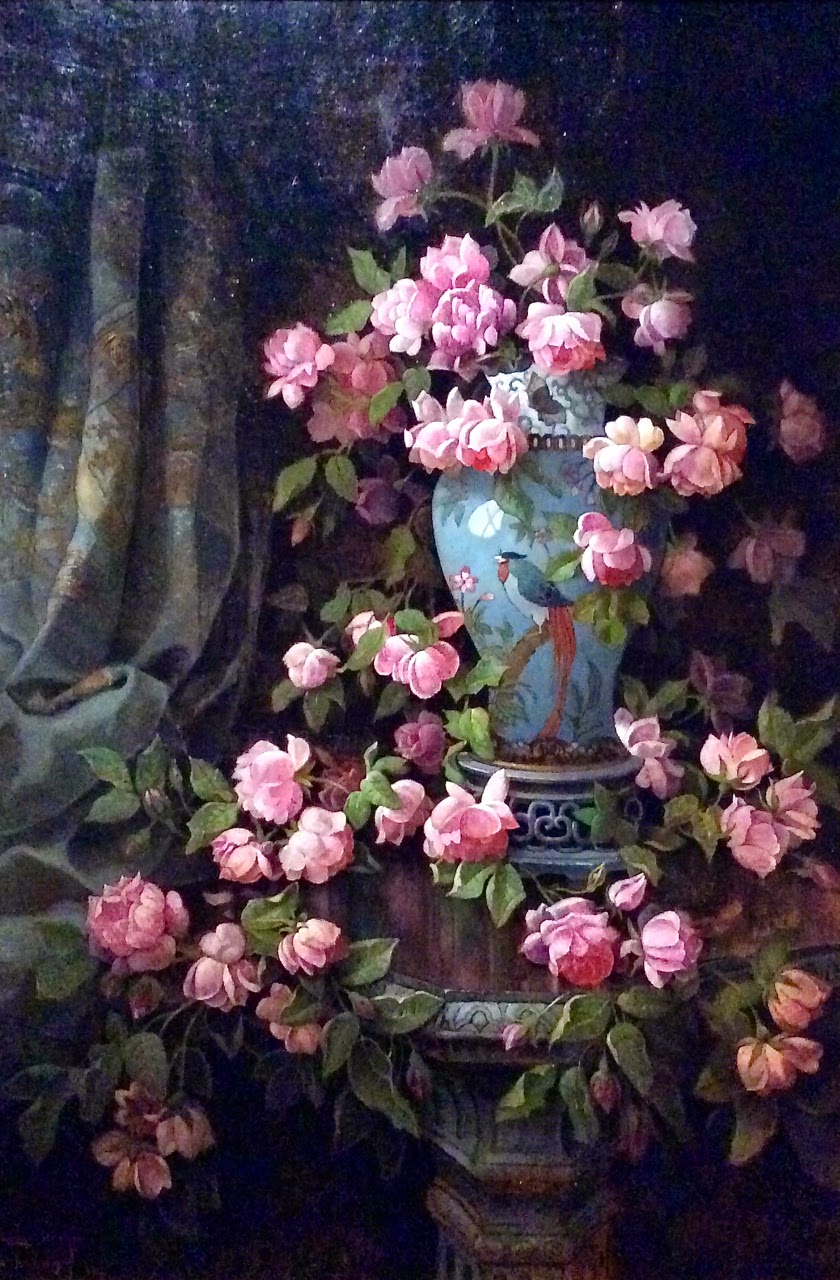
Roses, 1912 Crocker Art Museum
