= Requa =

Requa may refer to:

== Grapes ==
- Requa (grape), variety of grape

== People ==
- John Requa, American screenwriter
- Mark L. Requa (1866–1937), American mining engineer and conservationist; son of Sarah Mower Requa
- Richard Requa (1881–1941), San Diego architect
- Sarah Mower Requa (1829–1922), American philanthropist and California pioneer

== Places ==
United States

- Requa, California, community in Del Norte County
- Requa, Wisconsin, a community in Jackson County
