= Oscar Fitzalan Long =

United States Army general (1852–1928)

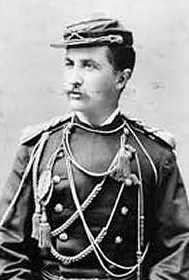
- Oscar Fitzalan Long
- Born: June 16, 1852; Utica, New York, U.S.
- Died: December 23, 1928 (aged 76); Piedmont, California, U.S.
- Burial place: Mountain View Cemetery, Oakland, California, U.S.
- Spouse: Amy Requa (m. 1896)
- Military career
- Allegiance: United States
- Branch: United States Army
- Service years: 1876–1904
- Rank: Brigadier General
- Conflicts: American Indian Wars
- Awards: Medal of Honor

Oscar Fitzalan Long (June 16, 1852 – December 23, 1928) was a United States Army Brigadier General who was a recipient of the Medal of Honor for valor in action on September 30, 1877, near Bear Paw Mountain, Montana. An 1876 graduate of West Point, he served in the Army until 1904.

== Education and American Indian Wars ==
Long was born in Utica, New York, in 1852. He received an appointment to West Point, graduating in 1876. He served most of his Army career in the American West. During the campaign against Chief Joseph of the Nez Perce in the fall of 1877, Long was one of nine men who received the Medal of Honor for valor at the Battle of Bear Paw Mountain.

== Medal of Honor citation ==
Rank and organization: Second Lieutenant, 5th U.S. Infantry. Place and date: At Bear Paw Mountain, Mont., 30 September 1877. Entered service at: Utica, N.Y. Born: 16 June 1852, Utica, N.Y. Date of issue: 22 March 1895.

Citation:

"Having been directed to order a troop of cavalry to advance, and finding both its officers killed, he voluntarily assumed command, and under a heavy fire from the Indians advanced the troop to its proper position."

== Personal life ==
On October 7, 1896, Long married Amy Requa, sister of Mark L. Requa.

== Later life and death ==
After retiring as a Brigadier General in 1904, Long moved to Oakland, California. Amy's parents, Isaac Lawrence Requa and Sarah Mower Requa, lived close by in Piedmont, California. Here, Long became a businessman. He was a member of the Sons of the American Revolution. He has a collection of papers on file at the University of California, Berkeley.
