= Wildwood Elementary School =

Wildwood Elementary School may refer to:

- Wildwood Elementary School (British Columbia), in British Columbia, Canada
- Wildwood Elementary School (California), in Piedmont, California, USA
- Wildwood Elementary School, in the Conejo Valley Unified School District, Thousand Oaks, California
