= Piedmont Middle School (disambiguation) =

Piedmont Middle School is a school in Piedmont, California.

Piedmont Middle School may also refer to:

- Piedmont Middle School, in the Berryessa Union School District, San Jose, California
- Piedmont Middle School, in Piedmont, Oklahoma
