= Millennium High School (California) =

High school in California, United States

Coordinates: 37°49′22.49″N 122°14′1.76″W

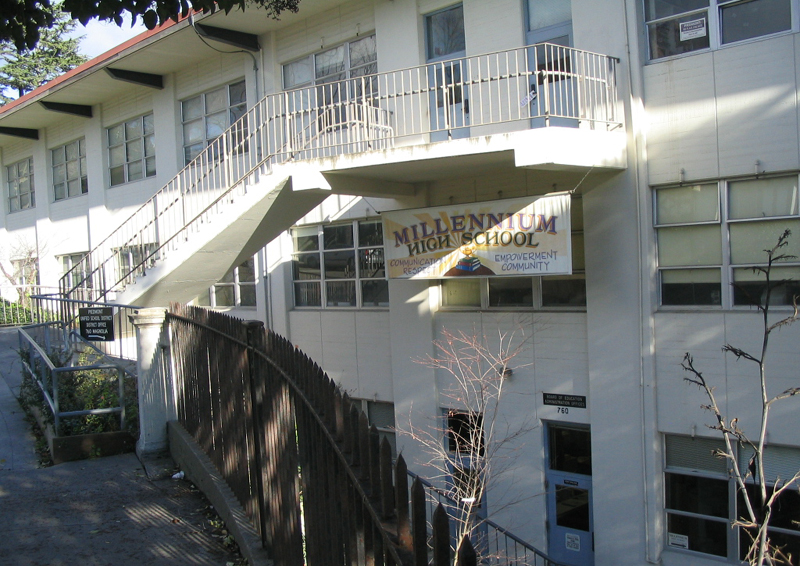

Information
- School type: Alternative high school
- Established: 2000; 26 years ago
- Enrollment: 59 (2023-2024)
- Average class size: c.10-20
- Website: mhs.piedmont.k12.ca.us

Millennium High School in Piedmont, California, United States is the Piedmont Unified School District's alternative high school.

== History ==
Millennium High School was officially founded in 2000 and was named after the turn of the millennium. Millennium High School serves as the Alternative High School for the Piedmont Unified School District.

== Academics ==
Classes are small, with about 10 to 20 students per class, so students can work at their own pace, and there is more personal attention than in a normal public high school. Credit is earned according to how much students accomplish in class, and they may also earn credits for outside activities, including sports or individual physical exercise programs, music and dramatic arts lessons and activities, employment, community college classes, and community service.

The Piedmont Educational Foundation supports a number of these programs through its grants program. Millennium students can also take courses at Piedmont High.

The curriculum is aligned with Content Standards for California Public Schools, and courses satisfy University of California "a-g" admission requirements.

In 2005, the school received an Academic Performance Indicator (API) score of 709, matching the state average exactly. It was the first year the school received a score. The average API score of the district that year was 920, an 18-point increase from the year before.

== Attendance ==
A significant difference between Millennium and Piedmont High School is that to attend PHS, a student must either prove residency in the city of Piedmont or have parents who work for the school district. Millennium is open to local students outside Piedmont, through interdistrict transfer.

== Millennium Falcon ==
George Lucas, the director of the Star Wars films, granted the school the right to use the image of the Millennium Falcon on a school sweatshirt, as well as to represent the school as its mascot, effectively creating the Millennium (High School) Falcon. Zak Filler '10 wrote to Mr. Lucas to request permission to continue with the move. "I am a big Star Wars fan," Filler wrote, "a bit on the nerdy side." According to Dr. Deah Schwartz, Filler's mother and one of the parents involved in organizing the project, as of February 5, 2009, about 50 shirts in all had been sold, to a student body that totals only in the 70s.

== See also ==
- Piedmont High School
- Piedmont Unified School District
