= Zhaoming Wu =

Chinese-born painter

- Born: 吴兆铭; Guangzhou City, China
- Education: Guangzhou Academy of Fine Arts (BFA), Academy of Art University (MFA)
- Occupation: Painter
- Years active: 1983–present
- Spouse: Qiuzhen Wei

Zhaoming Wu (吴兆铭) is a Chinese-born painter. Wu grew up in Guangzhou City, China and he received his BFA from Guangzhou Academy of Fine Arts and his MFA from the Academy of Art University, San Francisco, California, where he teaches painting.

== Personal life ==
Born in China to a physician mother and engineer father, Wu grew up during the Cultural Revolution. When Wu was 8 years old, he was forced to leave school after the government closed schools for two years. During this time, which he spent at home alone, he occupied himself by copying comic books, reading fiction and drawing illustrations inspired by the stories, and studying Chinese brush painting from books. When he was 12, his mother recognized his talent and asked one of her patients, a professor at Guangzhou Academy of Fine Arts, to train her son. The professor agreed, and Wu took private lessons from him for five years.

Following his graduation from high school, Wu took a job as a graphic artist for an advertising agency which required that he take classes every morning in graphic design from the Shanghai Light Industrial College. He credits that early work for honing his skills and for helping him to understand how to use imagery to tell a story.

Both an artist and a teacher, Wu served as a professor of painting at the Guangzhou Academy of Fine Arts.

Wu moved to the United States in 1991. He was hired as an instructor at San Francisco's Academy of Art University before earning his master's degree in fine arts in 1995.

A former resident of Piedmont, Wu lives in El Cerrito within the San Francisco Bay Area. He currently teaches painting at the Academy of Art University.

== Work ==
Wu focuses on figurative work, using live models, mainly women draped in cloth, although his repertoire includes landscapes and portraits. The curves of the body and folds in cloth remind Wu of nature, such as mountains, water, and sunrise and sunset. Wu's style is impressionistic and moody. It has evolved from initially painting "quickly and spontaneously" with exaggerated values and colors to growing more logical and conscious, according to Wu. Art of the West magazine described his work as "nothing if not Western in style and theme," despite Wu's training in China. This is also reflected in his choice of models.

Wu is known best for his figurative paintings. Inspired heavily by 19th century French painting, Wu describes his work as “representational, but not traditional classical.” This can be seen, as Wu uses modern elements of graphic design in his work.

Wu's design principles derive from traditional Chinese painting. Wu begins composing a new image by determining what he calls points, masses, and lines. A line refers to any prominent edge, shape, or series of shapes that sweeps through the painting. A point refers to any small shape, and a mass refers is any large shape or cluster of small shapes that can be grouped together to become one large shape. While a painting can be built on two or even just one of these three elements, Wu prefers to build his compositions on a mixture of all three. "I use points, masses, and lines the way a composer uses notes to write a song," Wu said.

Since 1983, Wu's work has been exhibited in Asia, Europe, and the United States. He has won awards including the Merit Award at the sixth National Art Exhibition, Beijing; the Gustafson Fund Award; the National Oil and Acrylic Painter's Society Award (United States); first place in the ninth Biennial National Figure Painting and Drawing Exhibition; second place in International Artist magazine Challenge No. 4 (Aug/Sept 2001); and the Daler-Rowney Award from the Oil Painters of America.

Wu has released seven books of his work and has been featured in three DVDs. His work has been published in International Artist Magazine (April/May 2003, August/September 2005), Art of the West (September/October 2004, July/August 2007), Art Talk Magazine (February 2005), and American Art Collector (January 2007). Wu was featured in the DVD Solitude: In the Studio with Zhaoming Wu, released December 2007.
