= Mark L. Requa =

American mining engineer (1866–1937)

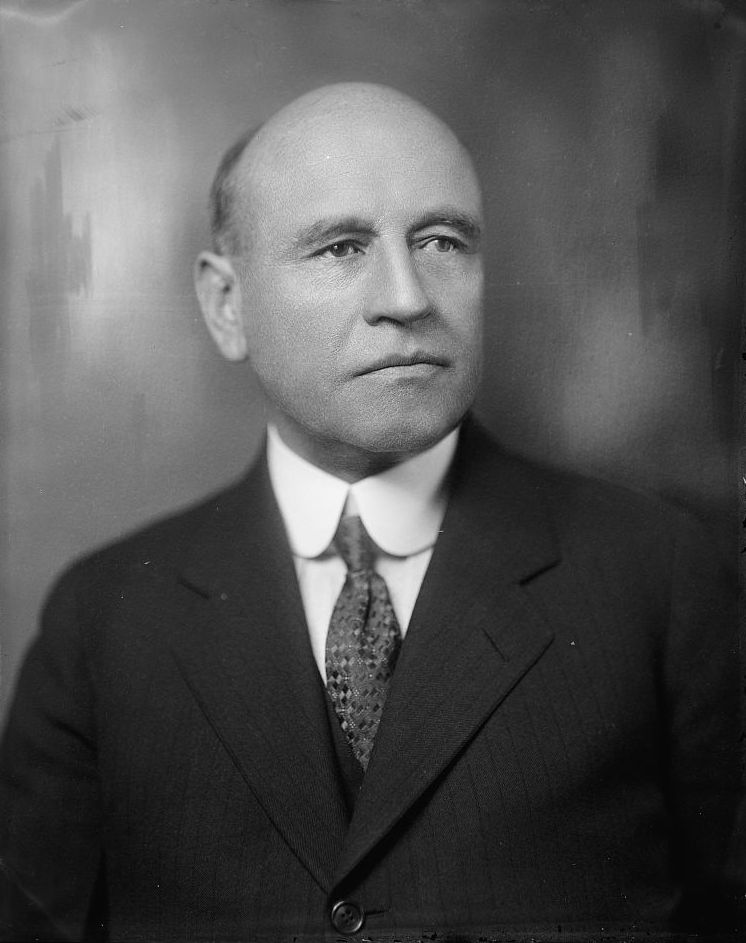
- Requa, 1905
- Born: Mark Lawrence Requa; December 25, 1866; Virginia City, Nevada, U.S.
- Died: March 6, 1937 (aged 70); Santa Barbara, California, U.S.
- Resting place: Santa Barbara Cemetery; Santa Barbara, California, U.S.
- Occupations: mining engineer; railroadman; government official
- Political party: Republican
- Spouse: Florence Herrick (m. 1895)
- Children: 3
- Parents: Sarah Mower Requa; Isaac Lawrence Requa

Mark L. Requa (December 25, 1866 – March 6, 1937) was an American mining engineer and petroleum conservationist. He served as the director of the Oil Division of the U.S. Fuel Administration during World War I. He helped manage the presidential campaigns of Herbert Hoover in 1928 and 1932.

== Early life ==
Mark Lawrence Requa was born on December 25, 1866, to Sarah Jane (née Mower) and Isaac Lawrence Requa in Virginia City, Nevada. Isaac Requa was a one time president of Oakland Bank of Savings and made a fortune in silver and gold mining in Virginia City. He was also an engineer with Comstock Mining and served as president of the Central Pacific Railroad. Requa was educated at the Requa School in Piedmont, California and at private schools. He was admitted into Yale University but could not attend due to poor eyesight.

== Career ==
Requa was the manager of the Eureka-Palisades Railroad. Requa organized the White Pine Copper Company in 1902. In 1904, Requa merged the White Pine Copper Company and the Boston and Nevada Copper Company into the Nevada Consolidated Copper Company. He formed the Nevada Northern Railway to transport copper ore from the Robinson Mine near Ely, Nevada to Cobre, Nevada.

Requa first met Herbert Hoover in 1905. Hoover brought Requa with him when he joined the U.S. Food Administration in June 1917 and Requa served as his assistant. By 1918, Requa was in charge of the commercial relations division of the Food Administration. He also served as a consulting engineer with the U.S. Bureau of Mines.

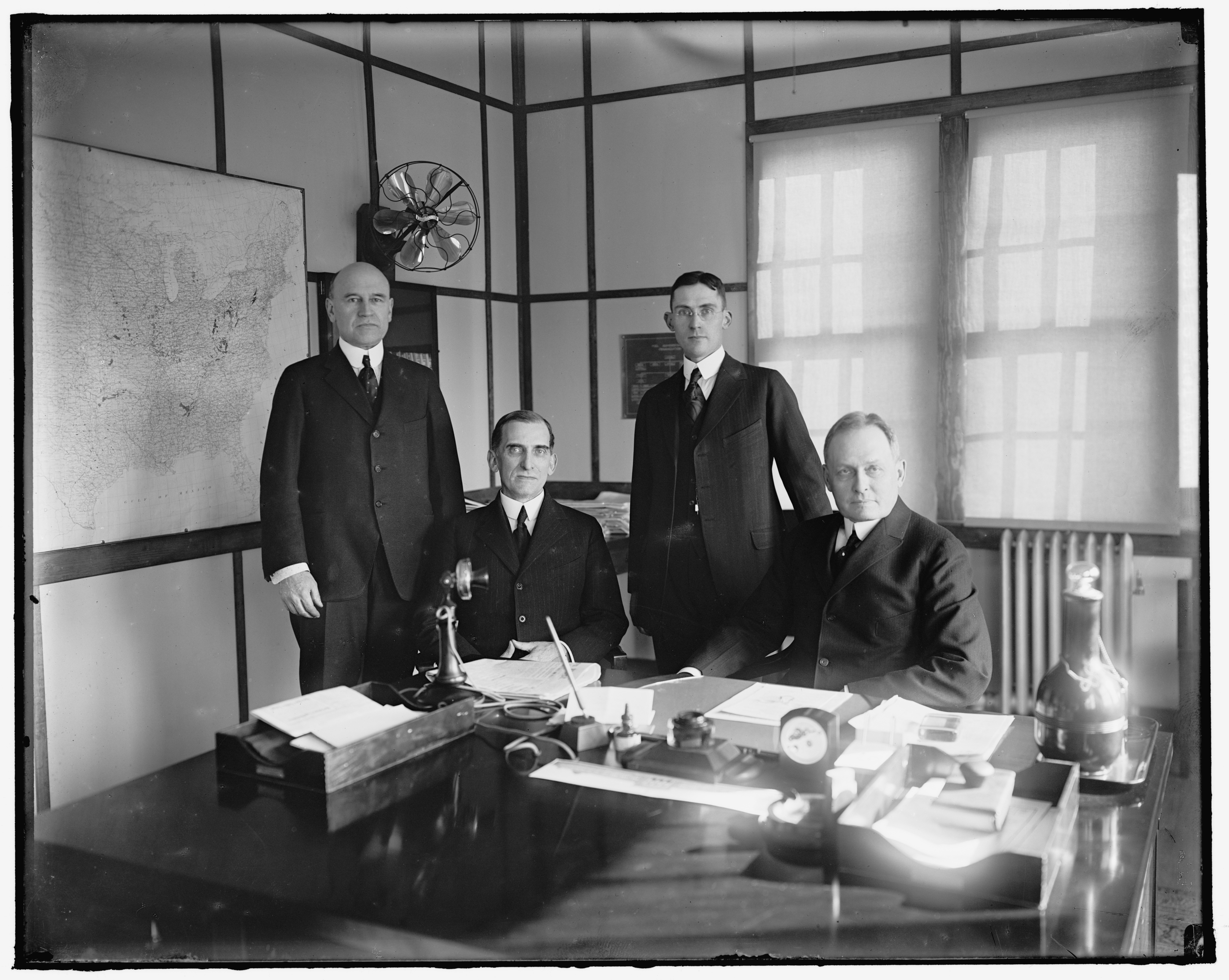
Requa, Harry Augustus Garfield and staff of the U.S. Fuel Administration

In January 1918, Requa became the director of the Oil Division of the U.S. Fuel Administration. He helped to coordinate the production and marketing policies to enable the oil industry to support the military needs of the United States during the war. He served in that role through World War I until the Administration was dissolved on June 30, 1919, and also served as the Petroleum Waste Conservator. He established "motorless weekends" while at the Fuel Administration. In 1921, at the World Engineering Congress in Tokyo, Requa warned nations about wasting petroleum.

After the war, he moved back to California. Requa would help manage Hoover's campaigns for the 1928 and 1932 presidential elections. He served as a committeeman from California to the National Republican Committee from 1932 to 1936.

In 1930, Requa served as chairman of the San Francisco Bay Bridge Commission, the commission set up to determine the site of the San Francisco Bay Bridge. Requa partnered with Hoover in mining ventures after his presidency.

Requa served as vice president of the American Institute of Mining, Metallurgical, and Petroleum Engineers from 1917 to 1920 and served as a trustee from 1917 to 1919. He also served as a member of the American Petroleum Institute.

Requa wrote two books, Grubstake and The Relation of Government to Industry.

== Personal life ==
Requa married Florence Herrick of Oakland, California in 1895. Together, they had two daughters and one son: Mrs. John Henry Russell, Mrs. William David Coy Filmer and Lawrence Kendall Requa.

His sister Amy Requa married General Oscar F. Long.

== Later life and death ==
Requa lived in Santa Barbara, California in his later years. He died on March 6, 1937, at St. Vincent's Hospital in Santa Barbara following complications from an abdominal operation three weeks earlier. He was buried at Santa Barbara Cemetery.
