= Ruth Leach Amonette =

American businesswoman, author, and educator (1916–2004)

- Born: Ruth Leach; September 24, 1916; Oakland, California, U.S.
- Died: June 21, 2004 (aged 87); Carmel, California, U.S.
- Other names: Ruth Pollock, Ruth Amonette
- Education: University of California
- Employer: IBM
- Known for: First female VP at IBM
- Spouses: Walter W. Pollock, Jr. (m. 1954); Wilbur K. Amonette (m. 1988)
- Children: 1

Ruth Leach Amonette (September 24, 1916 – June 21, 2004) was an American businesswoman, author, and educator. She was appointed as the first female executive and vice president at IBM in 1943, becoming one of only a few women in high-ranking corporate positions in the US at the time. She was renowned nationally for her work in business and as an educator.

== Early life and education ==
Ruth Leach was born in 1916 in Oakland, California. She had one sister. She attended Piedmont High School in Piedmont, California. She attended the University of California, Berkeley starting in 1933. She was a member of Kappa Kappa Gamma. While in school, she played tennis. After graduating in 1937 with a degree in political science, she worked as a dental assistant. Eventually, she quit to work at the Golden Gate International Exposition.

== IBM ==
Amonette started working at IBM in February 1939 as a Systems Service Representative. She worked at the Golden Gate International Exposition, presenting demos of IBM typewriters. She trained in service system work for IBM and was sent to work at IBM's Atlanta, Georgia office. She became a teacher for IBM at the United States Department of Education in Endicott, New York, in July 1940. In October, she became the Secretary of Education for Women for IBM. That position had her training women throughout IBM about selling IBM products throughout North America.

Amonette became vice president of IBM on November 16, 1943. She credited Thomas J. Watson providing the "vision and foresight" to employ her in a high-level position. This position made her one of the few women in corporate "power" positions in the United States and one of the youngest people in the nation to hold a high-level position.

In 1947, she recovered from tuberculosis, for which she had to take leave from IBM. She started work back at IBM that year. From 1947 to 1953, she was a board member for the Camp Fire Girls, the New York Public Library, the Professional Women's Club of New York, the American Association of University Women, and other organizations. In 1946, she served on the New York State Women's Council. She retired in 1953.

== Later life and legacy ==
After retiring, she married Walter Bill Pollock in 1954. They lived near Philadelphia, Pennsylvania. She was a board member of the Pennsylvania Horticultural Society. She and Pollock adopted a daughter in 1956. They relocated to Switzerland and then to California. Pollock died in 1977. Amonette remarried in 1988 to Wilbur K. Amonette. She published an autobiography in 1999. Amonette died in 1999. She died in Carmel, California in 2004.

== Recognition ==
- 1945 – Outstanding American Woman of the Year, Women's National Press Club
- 1945 – Merit Award, Mademoiselle
- 1946 – Achievement Award, Women's National Press Club
- 1996 – Induction, Women in Technology International Hall of Fame, Women in Technology International
