= Peter Cornell (basketball) =

American professional basketball player

Personal information
- Born: June 1, 1976 (age 50) San Francisco, California
- Listed height: 6 ft 11 in (2.11 m)
- Listed weight: 245 lb (111 kg)

Career information
- High school: Piedmont (Piedmont, California)
- College: Loyola Marymount (1996–1998)
- NBA draft: 1998: undrafted
- Playing career: 1998–2009
- Position: Center

Career history
- 1998–1999: Magic City Snowbears
- 1999: Pennsylvania ValleyDawgs
- 2000–2001: San Diego Wildfire
- 2001: Memphis Houn'Dawgs
- 2001: Partizan
- 2002: Las Vegas Slam
- 2002–2003: North Charleston Lowgators
- 2003–2004: Zhejiang Wanma Cyclones
- 2004–2005: Guangdong Southern Tigers
- 2005–2006: Rizing Fukuoka
- 2006: Sydney Spirit
- 2007–2008: Hitachi Sunrockers
- 2008–2009: Toshiba Brave Thunders Kanagawa

Peter Vasilevich Cornell (born June 1, 1976) is a retired American professional basketball player and occasional actor. In his 12-year career, he played for over 30 teams, in 15 leagues, and in 7 countries. As an actor, Cornell has been in over 60 national and international commercial campaigns, and has appeared in basketball-themed films. Most notably, he played the character Vakidis in 2008 comedy Semi-Pro.

Cornell is currently a real estate investor and developer, serving as the director of the Sports & Entertainment Division at the Oppenheim Group. He also dated two women from Netflix's Selling Sunset, a reality television series revolving around the Oppenheim Group, and is the stated source of their feud. Cornell is a minority investor in Leeds United.

== Early life ==
Cornell was born in San Francisco, California and raised in the small affluent town of Piedmont, California in the East Bay of the San Francisco Bay Area. He graduated from Piedmont High School in 1994 and received a full basketball scholarship to play at Loyola Marymount University.

== Filmography ==
=== Film ===
Year	Title	Role	Notes
2002	Like Mike	Himself	Uncredited
2008	Semi-Pro	Vakidis	

=== Television ===
Year	Title	Role	Notes
2016	Jane the Virgin	Donny	Episode: "Chapter Forty-Two"
2022	Kenan	Trevor	Episode: "The Whole Enchilada"
