= Piedmont Middle School =

Coordinates: 37°49′21.78″N 122°14′3.44″W

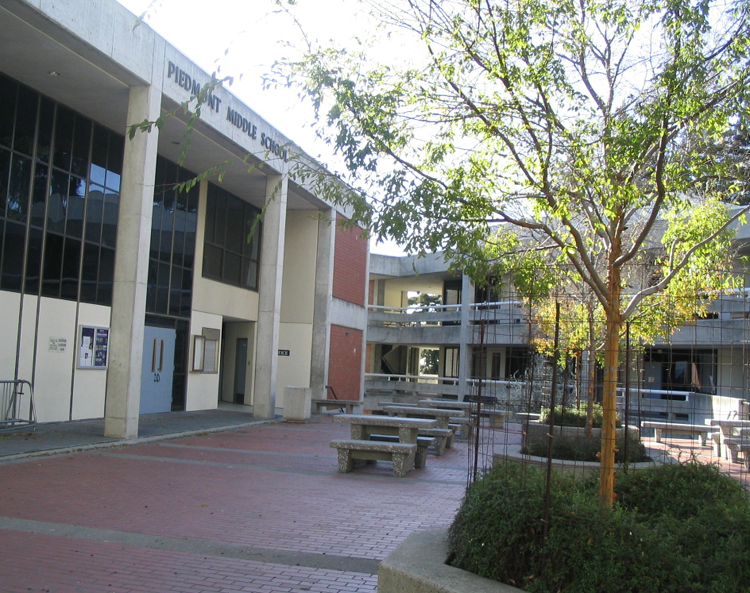

Location
- 740 Magnolia Avenue; Piedmont, California; United States

Information
- Type: Public Middle School
- School district: Piedmont Unified School District
- Principal: Karyn Shipp
- Grades: 6-8
- Colors: Purple, White
- Website: Piedmont Middle School

Piedmont Middle School (PMS) is part of the Piedmont Unified School District in Piedmont, California.

== Background ==
Piedmont Middle School provides education for students grades six through eight in the city. Piedmont students come from Frank C. Havens Elementary School, Wildwood Elementary School, and Egbert W. Beach Elementary School. Once they reach sixth grade, they are mixed together in the middle school, along with students from other districts who move to Piedmont.

The school district of Piedmont is noted for strong academics. With the middle school ranking in the top 2% of California public schools.

Piedmont Middle School was ranked in the top 3 California middle schools to look out for in 2025.

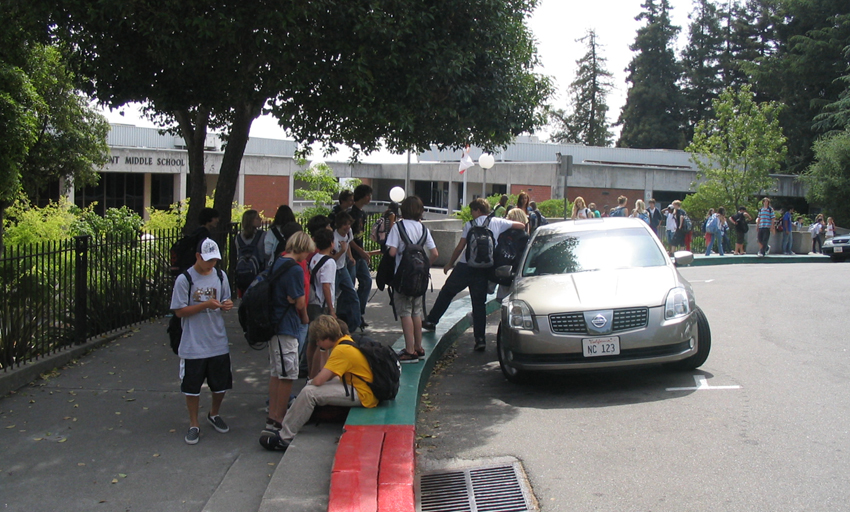
Students gather on the sidewalk in front of the middle school after school on a Friday afternoon.

== Location ==
The school is located next to the joint building of Millennium High School and Piedmont High School. It overlooks Witter Field and has a view of the west side of Piedmont, of Lake Merritt and Oakland, and, when there is little fog, the Bay and San Francisco. Located on Magnolia Avenue, the middle school is opposite the Piedmont Recreation Department.

Like most Piedmont schools, the middle school is in the center of town, and is only a few blocks away from Mulberry's Market, several banks, the police station, fire station and a gas station.

== Campus ==
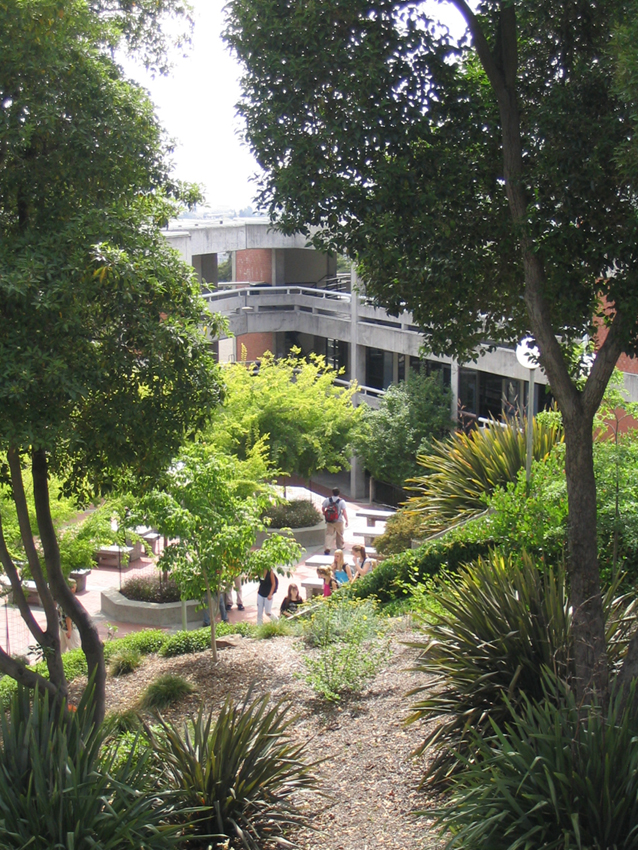
A view of Piedmont Middle School can be seen from the 40s building of the high school.

Although the school has closed lunch, much of the campus is open to the air. The campus sprawls from its street entrance to Witter Field at the back and Piedmont High School on the right.

=== Architecture ===
Unlike the high school, which was originally built in a neoclassical design in the 1920s, the middle school's design is reflective of its construction in the 1970s.

Piedmont Middle School is made of several buildings including the main building, which holds classrooms for core, math, social studies, english, and various electives, as well as a gymnasium ("the Buzz gym"), Food Service; the science buildings, which are lower than the main building; and the P.E./music building, which includes a gymnasium ("the Morrison gym"), locker rooms and rooms for band and orchestra. The main building has three floors, with the majority of sixth-grade classrooms on the first floor and the seventh- and eighth-grade classrooms dispersed throughout the school- which tumbles down a fairly steep hillside.

Much of the school is made of concrete with fake brick layers. Only a few buildings — such as the science and P.E. buildings — are completely indoors. The main building has open hallways. Most hallways and many classroom have views of the Bay.

== History ==
When Piedmont High School was created in 1921, it included grades seven through twelve, split into a junior high school and a senior high school. Piedmont Junior High School, grades seven through nine, became a separate entity from the senior high in the late 1960s, but the name change to Piedmont Middle School and switch to grades six through eight did not occur until a decade later.

When the high school was demolished for safety reasons in the mid-1970s, the separate junior high building was constructed. The dedication was made on June 1, 1975.

== Academics ==
In 2005, the school's API score was a 918. Ninety-eight percent of teachers are fully credentialed, and the average teaching experience is 15 years.

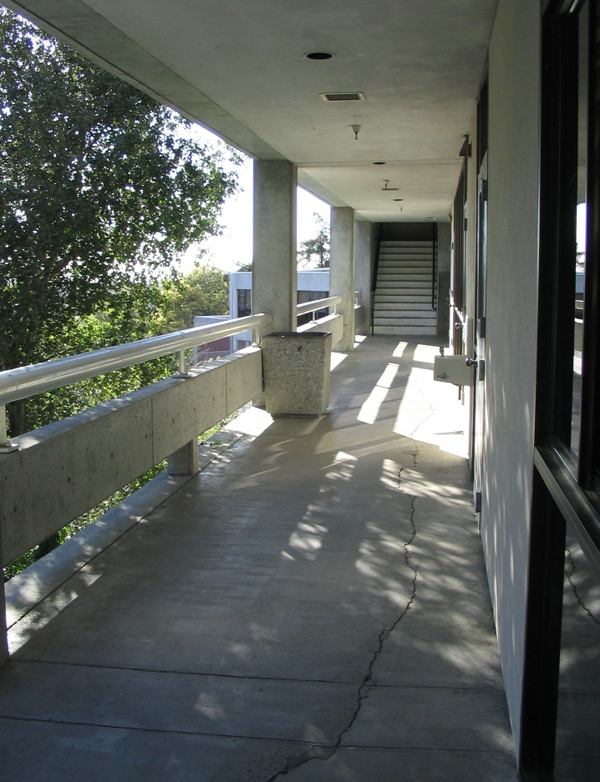
The majority of the school is open to the air, such as this hallway leading from the art room to the stairs that climb to the second floor, and to Food Service on the first floor.

== Schedule ==
The school runs on a block schedule, with all 7 classes on Mondays and a rotating schedule on Tuesday-Thursday and Wednesday-Friday.

=== Core ===
"Core" class aid in the transition from elementary to middle school. "Core" is a series of classes taught by the same teacher in the same room, much like the main teacher in elementary school. Sixth graders are taught reading, language arts and social studies by their core teacher. Seventh graders are taught language arts and social studies, but have a separate teacher for math. By eighth grade, the core system is nonexistent. Other classes not taught by core teachers including science teachers, physical education teachers, and elective teachers.

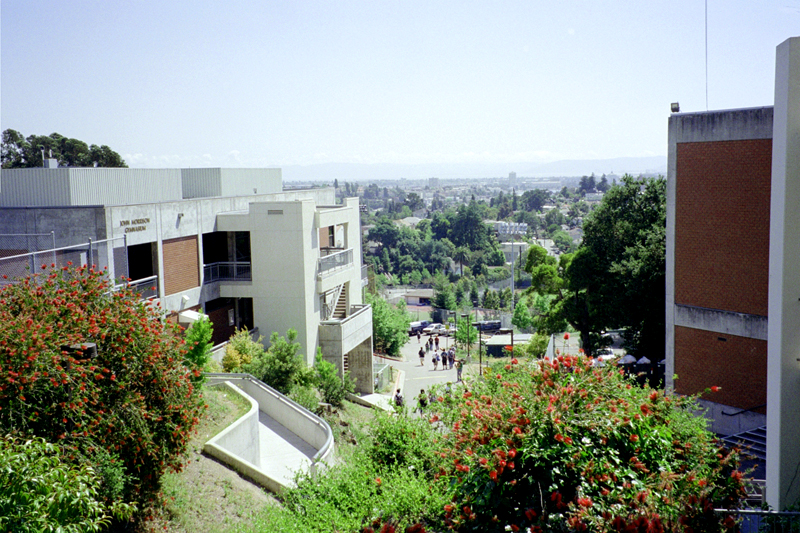
A view of Piedmont Middle School "P.E. hill," overlooking Witter Field and the greater Bay Area

=== Physical Education ===
All students are required to take physical education for all 3 years. In sixth grade, P.E. may be taken with band/orchestra so that students take P.E. every other day and music the remaining days. In seventh and eighth grade, P.E. is an everyday class. Students are required to wear a standard Piedmont P.E. T-shirt, along with purple shorts. The uniform may be purchased from the school. Students are required to run the mile weekly, if they take full-time P.E. If they do not, which may only occur in sixth-grade, they may run the mile every other week.

While teacher curricula differ, sports played in P.E. including ultimate frisbee, soccer, basketball, pickle ball, cooperative games, team handball, track and field, dance, archery, badminton and softball.

But the best activity is the heavenly 11. In 8th grade once a semester they have to be able to run 11 laps around the track (or about 2.75 miles) in under the target time which is set at 30 minutes.

== Demographics ==
In 2007, the student population was 67% white, 14% Asian, 11% two or more races, 6% Hispanic, 1% black and 1% Filipino. Less than 1 percent were in an English-learning program.

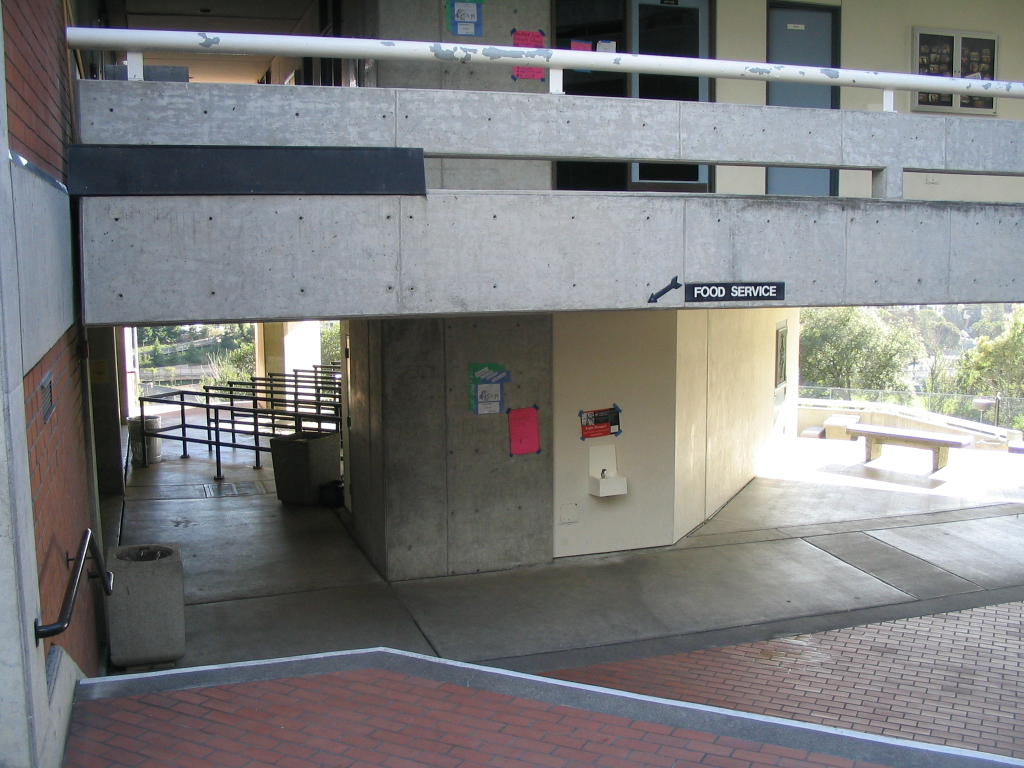
Students and staff members can buy snacks and lunch from Food Service during breaks such as lunch and brunch.

== Notable alumni ==
Actor Clint Eastwood attended what was in the mid-1940s Piedmont Junior High School. Among Eastwood's classmates was Joseph W. "Joe" Knowland, who later became the publisher of the Oakland Tribune.

== See also ==
- Piedmont, California
- Piedmont High School
