= Sarah Mower Requa =

American philanthropist and California pioneer

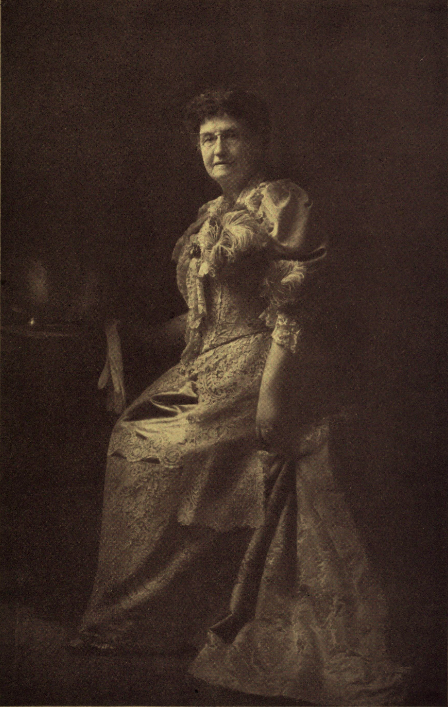
- Portrait photo from Problems Women Solved (1915)
- Born: Sarah Jane Mower; June 22, 1829; Bangor, Maine, U.S.
- Died: December 1, 1922; Piedmont, California, U.S.
- Occupation: Philanthropist
- Known for: Charity work
- Spouse: Isaac Lawrence Requa (m. 1863; died 1905)
- Children: 2, including Mark L. Requa
- Relatives: Oscar Fitzalan Long (son-in-law)

Sarah Mower Requa (1829–1922) was an American philanthropist and California pioneer involved with charity work. Her efforts began in the early history of Nevada with the founding of the small church at Gold Hill, and later at Oakland, California in the Old Ladies Home and in the Fabiola Hospital. During the Spanish–American War, when thousands of soldiers were arriving in San Francisco, she played an important part in feeding and clothing them, and through her efforts the Convalescent Home for sick soldiers returned from the Philippines was established.

== Early life ==
Sarah Jane Mower was born in Bangor, Maine, on June 22, 1829. Her parents were Dan and Mary (Horn) Mower. Sarah's siblings were Amos Horn (b. 1830), George Wesley (b. 1835), Lucy Ann (b. 1837), Maria Louise (b. 1839), and Flora Ellen (b. 1845). After Mr. Mower died in Maine of consumption, Mrs. Mower and her four daughters, shipped from Belfast, Maine to California by way of Cape Horn, dropping anchor inside the Golden Gate in the early 1850s, when the harbor was filled with vessels from all over the world, and San Francisco was but a village of huts and tents.

== Career ==
=== San Francisco, California ===
In San Francisco during the Vigilante days of 1851, Requa helped to make sashes for the San Francisco Committee of Vigilance.

=== Gold Hill, Nevada ===
Later, Requa went to Gold City mining district in the Nevada Territory, with her mother. (Note: According to Requa's obituary in the Oakland Tribune (1922), before the California gold rush, the mother died en route between Maine and California, leaving 14-year-old Sarah to take charge of her younger brothers and sisters and settle them in their new home.) Requa took to cooking with such skill that when she left Gold Hill, she had made US$14,000. Many of the wealthy miners used to bid as high as US$50 a plate to eat at her table when special state dinners were given. At Gold Hill, she met Isaac Lawrence Requa (1828–1905), a miner whose home was near hers. They were married on June 15, 1863, in San Francisco, and returned to Gold City.

Mr. Requa was associated with the Floods, Fairs, and Huntingtons in the Comstock Lode bonanza of Virginia City, out of which, when the big vein was struck, they made millions of dollars. He opened the Chollar-Potosi bonanza, on the Consolidated Virginia property, which was accredited with leading to the production of nearly US$14,000,000 worth of ore.

While in Nevada, Mrs. Requa founded the church at Gold Hill.

=== Piedmont, California ===
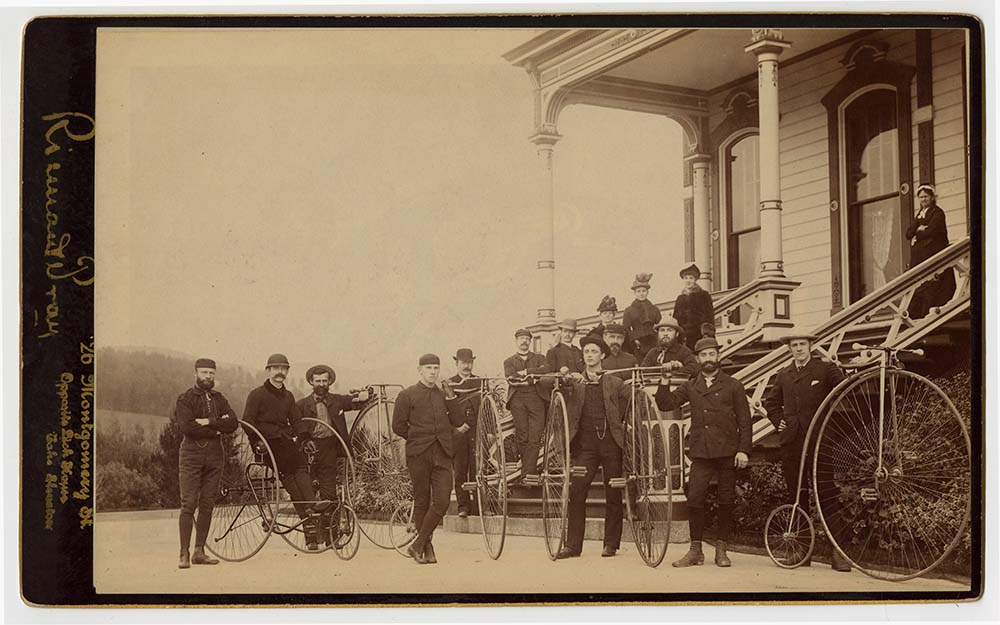
Bicyclists in front of the Requa residence (Highland Avenue and Hazel Lane, Piedmont, California)

In the early 1870s, the Requas came to California's East Bay, taking up 40 acres (16 ha) of land in what later became Piedmont. A large mansion, "The Highlands", was built on the spot where the Spanish adventurer, Gaspar de Portolá had camped with his Spanish exploration party in 1772. Mrs. Requa planted the trees which surrounded the home. Throughout its history, "The Highlands" was the gathering place for the pioneers of California and Nevada.

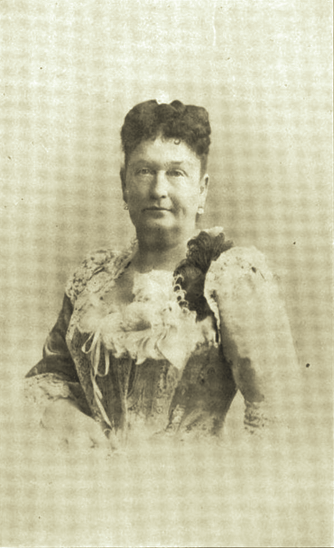
A Record of the Red Cross work (1902)

Here for 50 years, the wealthy Mrs. Requa dispensed many charities that gained her extended fame. She was the pioneer organizer in Oakland, California of the Ladies' Relief Society which for two generations provided homes and comfort for young children and old women in need. She was a founder of the Old Ladies' Home and of the Fabiola Hospital Association, of which she was president for many years.

The first Red Cross meeting ever held in California was assembled in the Requa home. Through her efforts, the Convalescent Home for sick soldiers returning from the Philippines to California to San Francisco during the Spanish–American War was established in Oakland. Thousands of soldiers benefited from her ministrations in providing food and sleeping quarters when the Government moved too slowly to take care of them. During the Spanish–American War, she gained national note for the work done in relieving thousands of soldiers encamped in Oakland and San Francisco.

The Requas were closely identified with the undertakings of the Huntington-Stanford-Crocker combine. Mr. Requa was a director of the Southern Pacific Railroad, and he provided trains to carry the soldiers to relief camps that Mrs. Requa had prepared, where for weeks, they were fed and sheltered. For this service, the Government gave official recognition. It was during this period that Mrs. Requa evolved her famous recipe for a "stew" that became so popular it was adopted in the United States Army:– For a thousand men, it was composed of "five whole sheep, three sacks potatoes, two sacks carrots, two sacks turnips, one sack onions", served smoking-hot, with a hard-boiled egg, and one or two green onions, to each man.

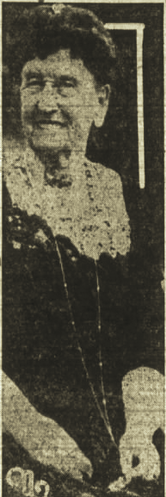
Oakland Tribune (1922)

Becoming a widow in 1905, she personally managed one of the largest estates in California. She was actively identified with the work of the Alameda County branch of the Travelers' Aid Society, of which she was honorary chair. In 1915, she served as the Honorary Vice-president for Alameda County during the Panama–Pacific International Exposition. During World War I, Requa was active in many forms of relief and patriotic work.

== Personal life ==
Sarah and Isaac had two children: a son, Mark L. Requa, and a daughter, Amy, whose husband was Brigadier General Oscar Fitzalan Long.

More than a year before her death, Requa suffered a fall in which her hip was broken. She was obliged to subsequently use crutches.

== Death and legacy ==
Sarah Mower Requa died at her home in Piedmont, California, on December 1, 1922, at age 93.

Her biographer, Amy Requa Russell, published My grandmother's story, Sarah Jane Mower in 1959.
