= Piedmont Unified School District =

School district in California, United States

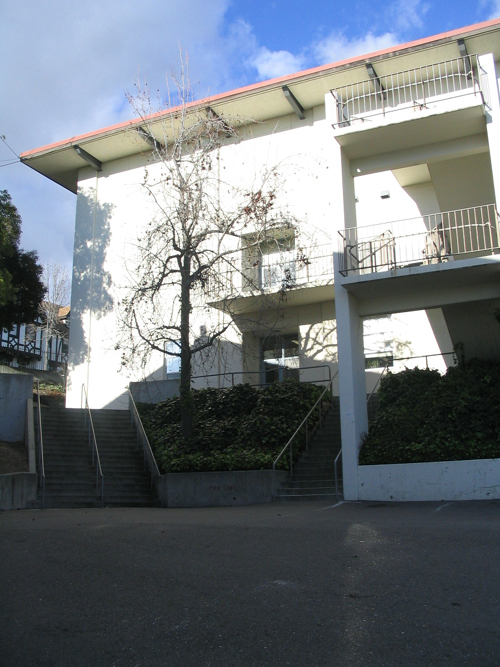
The district office shares a building with Piedmont High School and Millennium High School, and sits next to Piedmont Middle School.

The Piedmont Unified School District (PUSD) comprises the seven schools in the city of Piedmont, California, United States.

== Schools ==
- Egbert W. Beach Elementary School: the school was established in 1913. It was the city's second elementary school and it preceded the building of Piedmont High School in 1921. The school was named in honor of Egbert W. Beach, the first man from Piedmont to die in World War I.
- Frank C. Havens Elementary School: originally built in 1908, a year after the establishment of Piedmont as a city. The city's first elementary school, it originally went by the name the Piedmont (Bonita Avenue) School. The name was changed when the building was entirely rebuilt in the 1950s. The school is named after lawyer and real estate developer Frank C. Havens.
- Millennium High School
- Piedmont Adult School
- Piedmont High School
- Piedmont Middle School
- Wildwood Elementary School

== Academics ==
In 2005, the average API score of the district was 920, 18 points higher than the previous year.
