= Piedmont High School (California) =

Coordinates: 37°49′24.35″N 122°13′58.86″W

Location
- 800 Magnolia Avenue; Piedmont, California; U.S.

Information
- Type: Public high school
- Motto: "Achieve the Honorable"
- Established: 1921
- Principal: David Yoshihara
- Teaching staff: 44.70 (FTE)
- Grades: 9-12
- Enrollment: 730 (2023–2024)
- Student to teacher ratio: 16.33
- Campus: Suburban with close proximity to urban areas
- Color
- Mascot: Highlander
- Rival: Bishop O'Dowd High School
- Newspaper: The Piedmont Highlander
- Yearbook: The Pride
- Website: Piedmont High School Official Website
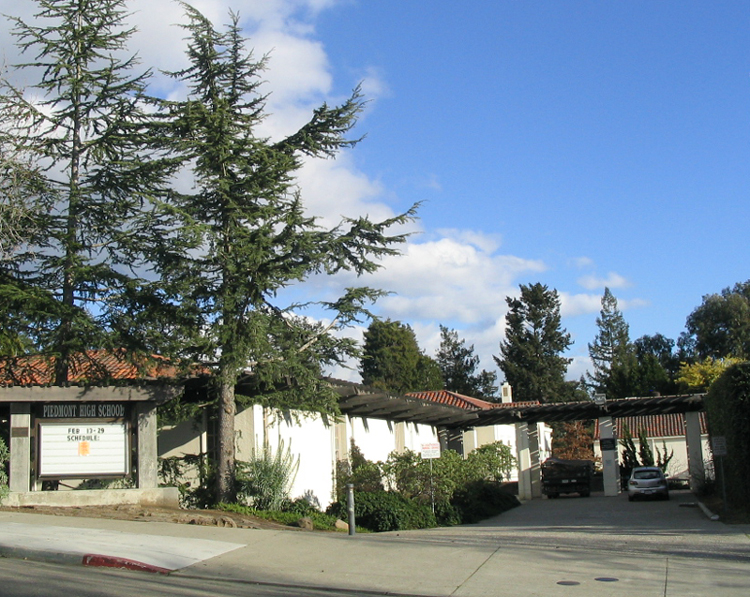
- View of the front of the school from opposite side of Magnolia Avenue

Piedmont High School is a public high school located in Piedmont, California, United States, and is one of two high schools in the Piedmont Unified School District.

Designed by architect W. H. Weeks, the school was built in 1921 in a neoclassical design, part of the same plan that built the Piedmont city's Exedra.

== Background ==
Piedmont High School offers school for children aged ninth through twelfth grade. Piedmont's colors are purple and white (representing the Scottish thistle), and its mascot, the Highlander, reflects the school's Scottish heritage.

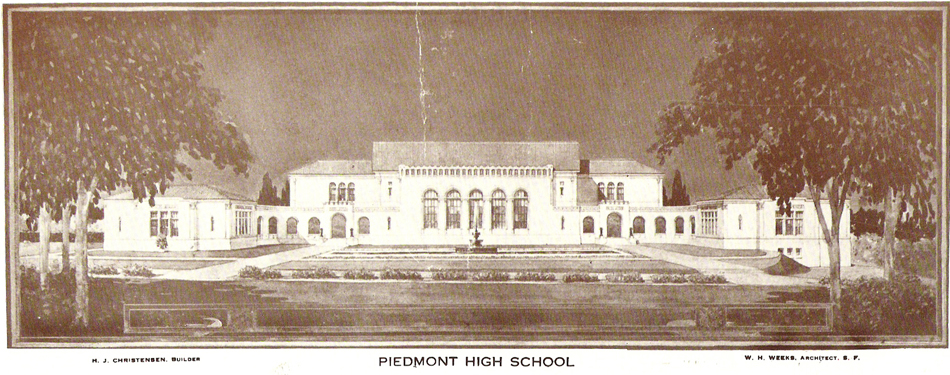
A bond for the creation of Piedmont High School was passed in 1920, and the school was built in 1921.

== History ==
Funded by a bond passed by voters in 1920, the Piedmont Unified School District opened the city's first high school in September 1922.

Piedmont High was the last school in California to resist pressure from the state to stop enforcing a provision in their dress code which required students wear a uniform.

== Campus ==
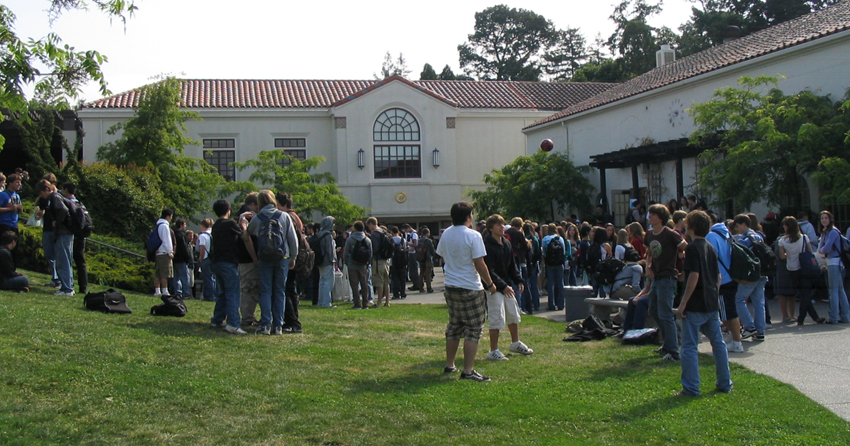
Students congregate on the grass in the quad during brunch, a 15-minute break between first and second blocks.

Piedmont High School has an open campus, by which students can leave during brunch, lunch, and unscheduled periods. The campus is between Piedmont Park on the right of the school and Piedmont Middle School and Witter Field on the left.

The center of campus is a grassy area referred to as "the quad." The quad connects the former site of the Alan Harvey Theatre, the library, the cafeteria and student center, and the amphitheater. Classrooms are scattered around campus, with the music and social studies buildings the furthest apart.

The campus was originally built on a portion of Piedmont Park, and dog-walking trails behind the school connect to the park.

=== Architecture ===
The school was built in 1921 in a neoclassical design, part of the same plan that built the Piedmont city's Exedra. Since its designed by architect W.H. Weeks, the school has undergone several reconstructions, for reasons such as expansion, earthquake retrofitting, and combatting dry rot.

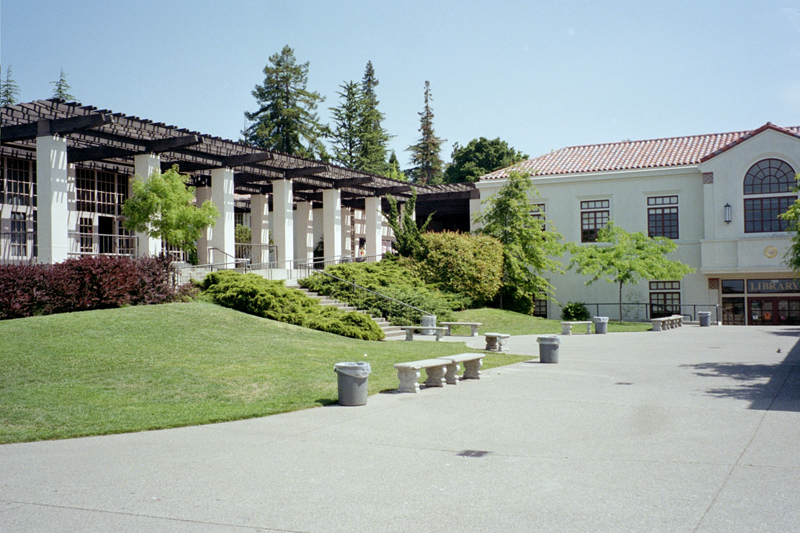
The school exhibits various styles of architecture, with remains of the original neoclassical design in the library.

In 1974, the school was declared unsafe, under state earthquake laws. It was partially demolished, and three new classroom buildings and a gymnasium were built. The original library, quad, and administration buildings were rehabilitated.

Reconstruction in the 1970s reflected the "back-to-nature" look popular at the time, using wood instead of shingles. The school's "breezeway," an open, wide corridor running between the school's main buildings, exemplified this.

During the 2003-2004 school year, the gymnasium was expanded to include an entrance room that also displays trophies. The school has undergone further construction following Measure E, which issued $56 million in bonds for the reconstruction of school facilities to meet earthquake safety guidelines.. More recently, the old theater and social studies buildings were demolished, and replaced with a three-story STEAM building (housing classes in science, math, engineering, and art) along with a new Alan J. Harvey Theater which includes both a proscenium theater and an upstairs black box theater and classrooms.

== Academics ==
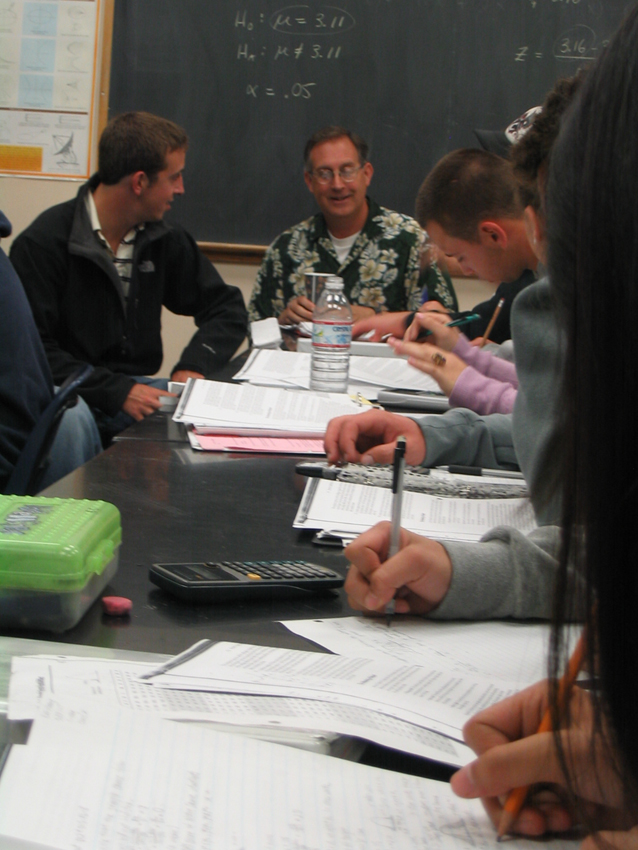
Statistics is one of the elective math classes offered.

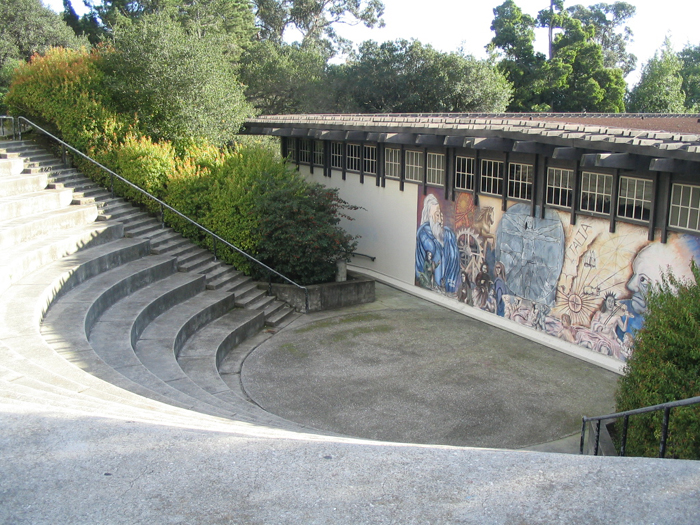
The amphitheater is used for outside performances, such as those during lunch. The mural, painted by past AP Art students, was vandalized in 2005 and had to be repainted by the AP Art students of that year.

Piedmont High School is an academically strong school, scoring a 10 out of 10 for test scores at the website GreatSchools.net. In 2008, it was ranked in the top 100 schools in the nation by U.S. News & World Report. The school newspaper reported that the average of GPA of 2006's graduating class was 3.47.

=== Courses ===
==== Advanced Placement ====
As of 2009–2010, the school offers the following AP courses:

- AP Biology
- AP Calculus AB and BC
- AP Computer Science (both AP Computer Science A and AP Computer Science Principles)
- AP English Literature
- AP Environmental Science
- AP French Language
- AP Music Theory (offered bi-yearly)
- AP Spanish Language
- AP Studio Art 2D and 3D
- AP United States History
- AP Chinese Language and Culture

In addition, honors courses in physics, chemistry, and statistics are offered.

==== Creative and performing arts ====
Creative classes are offered in various fields: music (a cappella, band, orchestra, AP Music), visual art (2-D art, ceramics, 2-D AP, 3-D AP), drama (Acting I through IV), dance (Beg-Adv). The school also produces a musical every year as a part of extracurricular.

==== Electives ====
Other electives offered include the Pride (yearbook) and the Piedmont Highlander (school newspaper), law and society, public speaking, multiple computer classes, and creative writing.

==== Foreign languages ====
Spanish, French, and Mandarin are the three foreign language courses the school offers. In 2007-2008 an AP Mandarin course was added. Before the 2007–2008 school year, Mandarin classes ranged from Mandarin I to Mandarin V (honors). The Mandarin program was added in 1995–1996, when it replaced German.

==== Recent changes ====
===== 2006–2007 =====
An AP European History course was added, while the junior-level course Honors Chemistry was opened to qualifying sophomores.

===== 2007–2008 =====
The current Mandarin V (honors) was replaced by AP Mandarin.

The science curriculum changed from the system of "Integrated Science" to specific subjects, such as biology. In the old system, students took Integrated Science I as freshmen, Integrated Science II as sophomores, and either chemistry or honors chemistry as juniors. The new system allows incoming freshmen to choose between physical science (for "most students") and biology (for "students showing mastery of PMS science"). The options are shown in detail below:

Grade	For most students	For students demonstrating a strong interest in science	For students showing mastery of middle school science
9th	physical science	physical science	biology
10th	biology	biology, and chemistry or honors chemistry	honors chemistry
11th	chemistry or honors chemistry, and optional second science elective	honors chemistry	up to two science electives (optional)
12th	up to two science electives (optional)	up to two science electives (optional)	up to two science electives (optional)

ROP-funded journalism, sports medicine, and biotechnology were added. Also, math progression was clearly defined as follows

Grade	For students less adept in mathematics	For students proficient in mathematics	For students advanced in mathematics
9th	Algebra I	Geometry	Algebra II
10th	Geometry	Algebra II	Math Analysis
11th	Algebra II	Math Analysis	AP Calculus AB
12th	Math Analysis	AP Calculus AB	AP Calculus BC

=== Honors society ===
The school decided to form its own honors society following the 2005–2006 school year. The new group, the Piedmont Honors Society, has a GPA cut-off of 3.60. In addition, there is a community service requirement of 15 pre-approved hours for sophomores, 25 for juniors, and 35 for seniors. The class of 2007 is the last class to maintain eligibility and membership with CSF.

=== School publications ===
The school newspaper is the Piedmont Highlander, and the yearbook is the Pride but both were known as the Clan-O-Log until 2017. Both have existed since the early decades of Piedmont High history, and participants of each publication are involved by taking the offered course. In 2006, the Highlander placed sixth in the National Scholastic Press Association's Best of Show contest. In 2007, the library's Teen Advisory Board revived the publication of the literary magazine The Highland Piper, which had last been published in the 1970s. The publication has since been discontinued.

== Demographics ==
As of 2025, 53% of the student body was white, 19% were two or more races, and 15% were Asian according to the California Department of Education.

In 2004, the San Francisco Chronicle highlighted the lack of racial and socioeconomic diversity in Piedmont in a Sunday front-page story. Comparing schools in Oakland and Piedmont, the article writer wrote that "wealth has created separate and unequal schools in [the] Bay Area and elsewhere."

The majority of high school students have lived in Piedmont since elementary school. As in the surrounding cities, only residents of the city can attend school at the district, unless a parent is a district employee. Homes with physical addresses in Oakland that partially abut sections of the Piedmont borders can also send their children to Piedmont schools.

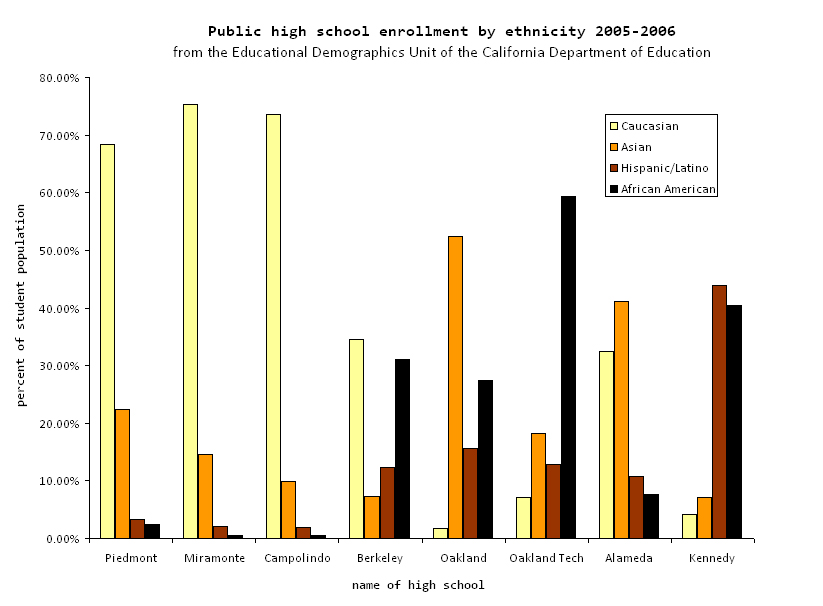

== Library ==
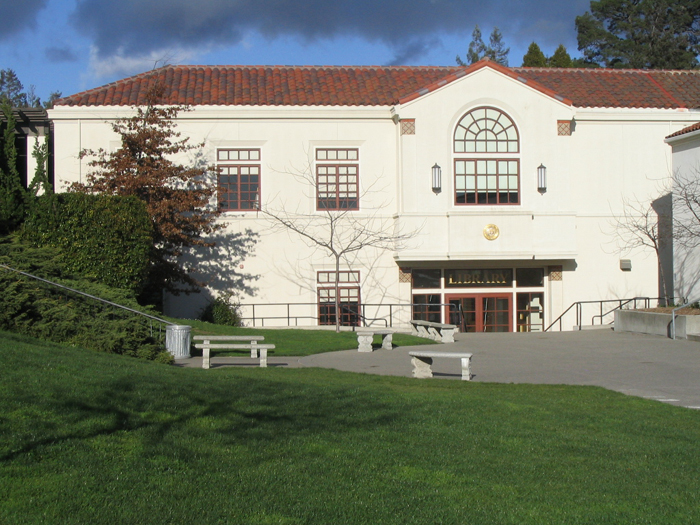
The high school library serves as a reference source and place to study.

At the beginning of the 2006–2007 school year, the library set up the Teen Advisory Board, a group for students to contribute to the library through writing book reviews, recommending purchases, buying books, decorating the library, organizing library events, and publishing a literary magazine. The literary magazine, The Highland Piper, was launched in the spring of 2007 to publish student original writing. It took its name from the school literary magazine published in the 1930s. It was last printed in June 2009, but a new edition is planned for spring 2014.

== Bird Calling Contest ==
Piedmont High is home to the nationally known Leonard J. Waxdeck Bird Calling Contest. Winners of the contest have been featured on the Late Show with David Letterman, The Ellen DeGeneres Show, and The Tonight Show Starring Johnny Carson. The contest was started in 1963 by biology teacher Leonard J. Waxdeck.

== Sports ==
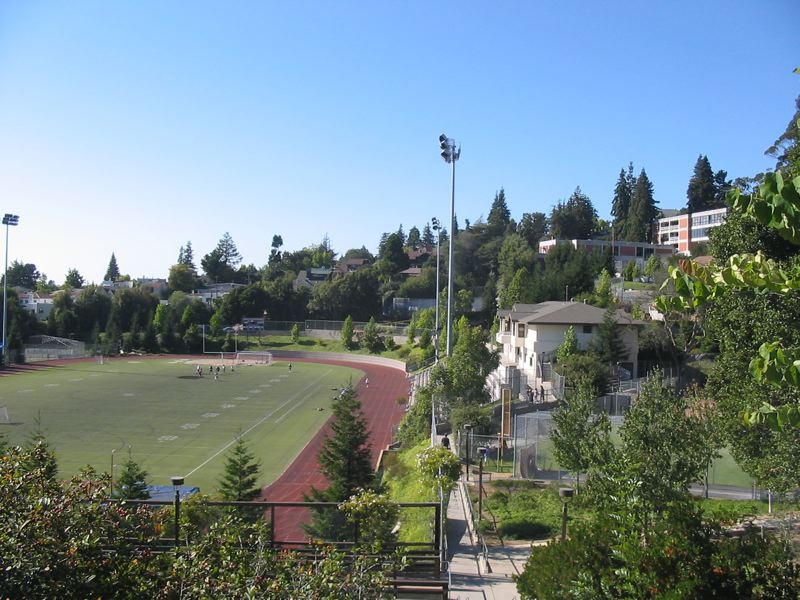
View overlooking Witter Field, which is used by the sports teams of Piedmont High School and Piedmont Middle School.

PHS offers a variety of varsity and junior varsity sports. In addition, many Piedmont students participate in the national championship-winning rowing team Oakland Strokes; at least one Piedmont graduate, Scott Gault, has competed in the Olympics and World Rowing Championships.

=== Fall ===
- Men's American football ( JV, VAR)
- Women's volleyball (JV, VAR)
- Women's tennis (JV, VAR)
- Women's golf (VAR)
- Women's cheerleading (VAR)
- Water polo (JV, VAR)
- Cross country (JV, VAR)

=== Winter ===
- Soccer (JV, VAR)
- Basketball (FR, JV, VAR)

=== Spring ===
- Coed Badminton (VAR)
- Men's baseball (JV, VAR)
- Women's softball (JV, VAR)
- Men's tennis (JV, VAR)
- Men's golf (VAR)
- Lacrosse (JV, VAR)
- Swimming (JV, VAR)
- Track and field (JV, VAR)
- Rugby (A, B)

Piedmont High football ex-coaches Kurt Bryan and Steve Humphries created the A-11 offense, a controversial football offense in which any of the 11 players on the field is eligible. The offense relies on confusion, and its unconventional look can wreak havoc on even bigger, stronger and faster teams.

In 2004 and 2005, the nationally-ranked women's basketball team won two consecutive division IV state championships.

In 2005, the men's varsity Cross Country team became the only men's team to win a state title in the history of the school.

In 2010, Piedmont lacrosse posted a 15–7 record and won a regular-season BSAL championship.

In 2011, the boys' tennis team finished the season as BSAL League champs, not having lost a league match in 11 straight years.

PHS uses the Highlander, a kilt-clad Scotsman caricature playing the bagpipes, as its mascot.

== Notable alumni ==
- Ruth Leach Amonette, first female vice president of IBM
- Dyke Brown, graduated in the class of 1932, best known for founding The Athenian School, a college preparatory boarding school located in Danville, California.
- Dean Butler, graduated in the class of 1974. Professional actor best known for work on Little House on the Prairie.
- Vern Corbin, All-American basketball at Cal in 1928–29
- Peter Cornell, basketball player and actor known for Semi-Pro
- Jim Cullom, former professional football player
- Clint Eastwood, spent part of his academic career in Piedmont before switching to Oakland Technical High School in neighboring Oakland, California
- Chloe Fineman, class of 2006. Comedian and Saturday Night Live cast member.
- Brad Gilbert, professional tennis player (World # 4) and coach
- Dana Gilbert, tennis player
- Joseph Grodin, California Supreme Court Justice from 1982 to 1987
- Alex Hirsch, creator of Gravity Falls
- Robert McNamara, former Secretary of Defense, graduated in 1933 after maintaining a straight "A" average
- Drew Olson, former UCLA quarterback
- Ashley Paris, class of 2005, basketball player
- Courtney Paris, class of 2005, WNBA player
- Gary Ruvkun, class of 1969, 2024 Nobelist in Physiology and Medicine
- J. Christopher Stevens, class of 1978. Ambassador to Libya, killed 11 September 2012 in Benghazi.
- Maggie Tokuda-Hall, author, whose book Squad was inspired by her Piedmont high school experiences
- Colin Trevorrow, class of 1995, film director of Jurassic World and sequels

== Awards ==
Piedmont High School has been awarded the Blue Ribbon School Award of Excellence by the United States Department of Education.
