= Piedmont, California =

City in California, United States

- City
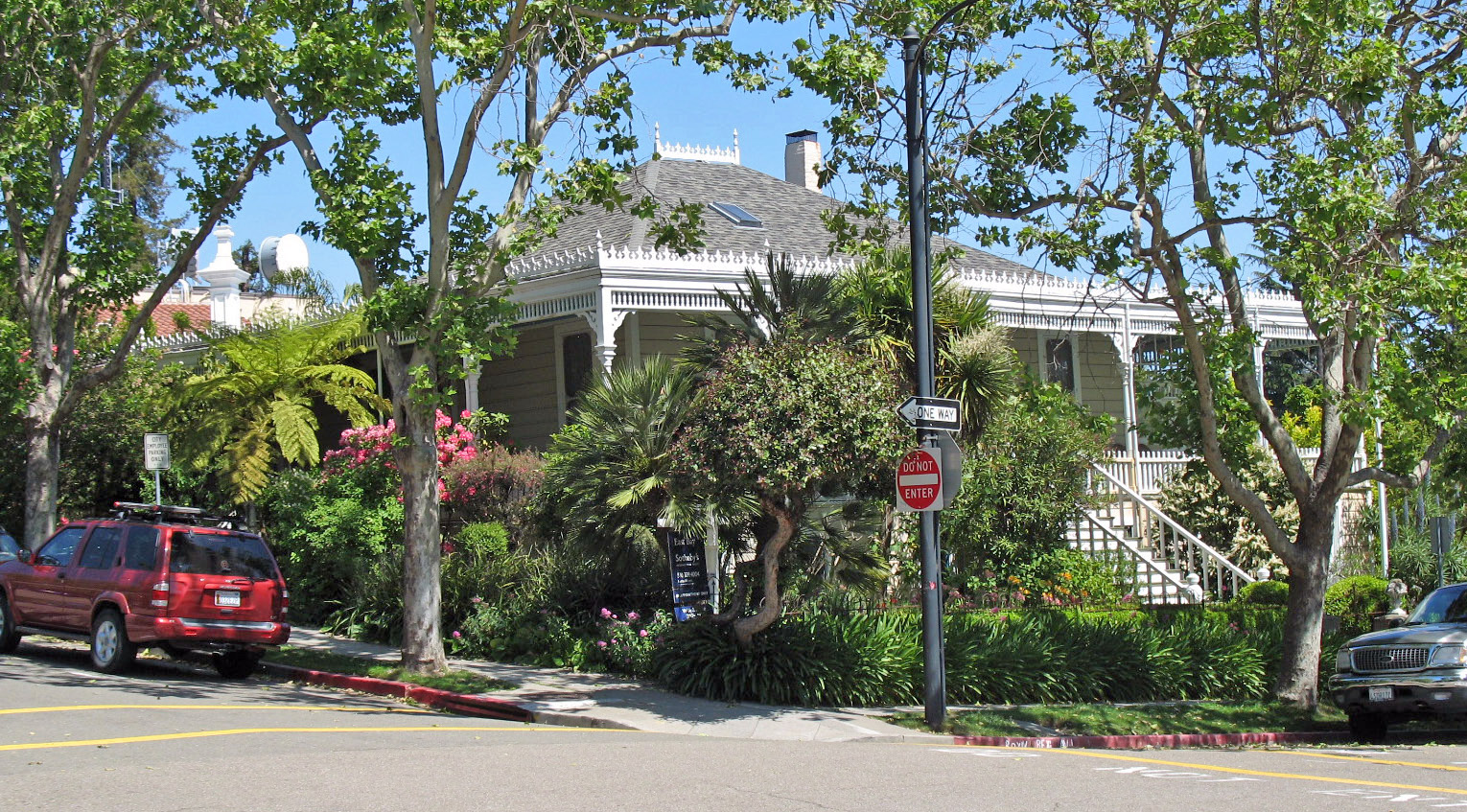
- The 1878 historic Wetmore House in central Piedmont
- Interactive map of Piedmont, California
- Location in California Piedmont, California (the United States)
- Coordinates: 37°49′N 122°14′W
- Country: United States
- State: California
- County: Alameda
- Incorporated: January 31, 1907

Government
  - Mayor: Betsy Smegal Andersen
  - State Senate: Jesse Arreguín (D)
  - State Assembly: Buffy Wicks (D)
  - U. S. Congress: Lateefah Simon (D)
  - Alameda County Board of Supervisors: Nikki Bas

Area
  - Total: 1.70 sq mi (4.40 km^{2})
  - Land: 1.70 sq mi (4.40 km^{2})
  - Water: 0 sq mi (0.00 km^{2}) 0%
- Elevation: 331 ft (101 m)

Population (2020)
  - Total: 11,270
  - Density: 6,630/sq mi (2,560/km^{2})
- Time zone: UTC-8 (Pacific (PST))
  - Summer (DST): UTC-7 (PDT)
- ZIP code: 94602, 94610, 94611, 94618
- Area codes: 510, 341
- FIPS code: 06-56938
- GNIS feature IDs: 1659383, 2411418
- Website: www.ci.piedmont.ca.us

Piedmont is a small city in Alameda County, California, United States, enclaved by the city of Oakland. Its residential population was 11,270 at the 2020 census. The name comes from the region of Piedmont in Italy, and it means 'foothill'. Piedmont was incorporated in 1907, and was developed significantly in the 1920s and 1930s.

== History ==
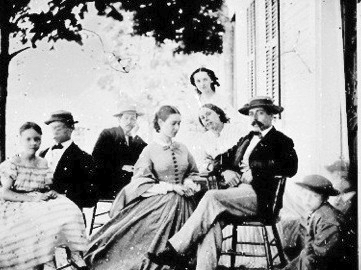
Piedmont and much of the East Bay was part of Rancho San Antonio, granted to the Peralta family in 1820.

The original neighborhood of Piedmont was larger than the current municipality of Piedmont, with the Mountain View Cemetery considered full part of the Piedmont neighborhood.

Residents initially sought incorporation in 1907. Two elections were held among the citizens of Piedmont in 1907, both of which narrowly upheld the decision for Piedmont to become a separate city, rather than become a neighborhood within the city of Oakland.

According to the city's webpage, "In the Roaring Twenties, Piedmont was known as the 'City of Millionaires' because there were more millionaires per square mile than in any city in the United States." Many of these millionaires built mansions that still stand, notably on Sea View Avenue and Sotelo Avenue/Glen Alpine Road in 'Alta' Piedmont. Piedmont became a charter city under the laws of the state of California on December 18, 1922. On February 27, 1923, voters adopted the charter, which can only be changed by another vote of the people.

Like surrounding Oakland, Piedmont has a history of racial segregation, but it also has a separate history of racial exclusion. On January 21, 1924, Sidney and Irene Dearing, a Black and Seminole couple, got around the city's restrictive housing covenants by purchasing a home using a white family member as a proxy. They could not count on the city of Piedmont to protect them from violent threats against their lives—the chief of police at the time, Burton Becker, was an active member of the Ku Klux Klan. In May, a mob of over five hundred residents of Piedmont gathered at their home to demand they leave. In June, multiple bombs were planted on and around the Dearings' property. That same month, the city council voted to condemn the property, nominally to extend a road. On February 14, 1925, the city of Piedmont bought the property. Rather than demolish it, they re-sold it later that year.

Before 1968, restrictive housing covenants and redlining were used to exclude non-whites in the city for many years. The American sociologist and historian James W. Loewen identified Piedmont as a "probable" sundown town, meaning that non-whites were not welcome after dusk and could face violence and intimidation. While surrounding Oakland is one of the most ethnically and culturally diverse cities in the United States, Piedmont has a less racially diverse population. Attempts to ethnically and culturally diversify the city and allow for higher density and affordable housing are typically met with resistance from the city's residents.

In early 2021, the city council indicated that it intended "to move forward with public acknowledgement and an apology for the abhorrent treatment Sidney Dearing and his family received in 1924." In 2023, landscape architect Walter Hood was selected to design a memorial on a piece of land in front of the Dearings' former house.

In August 2017, the mayor of Piedmont, Jeffrey Wieler, resigned after making disparaging Facebook posts about Black Lives Matter and transgender people.

== Geography ==
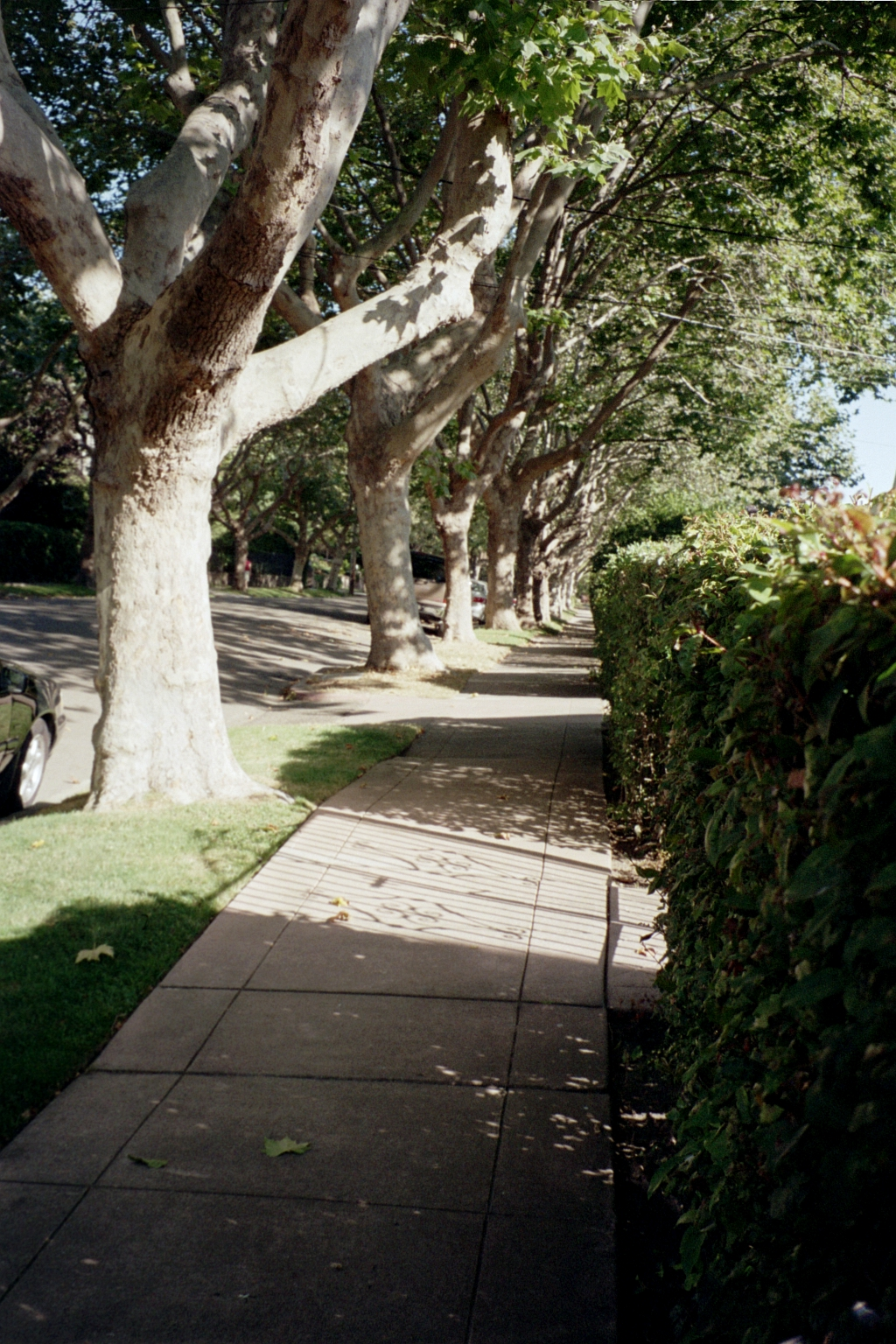
El Cerrito Avenue, one of Piedmont's tree-lined streets

Piedmont is located near the Hayward Fault, a geological fault line that runs through the East Bay region. The city has a total land area of 1.7 square miles (4.4 km^{2}), all land.

=== Borders ===
Piedmont is surrounded on all sides by the city of Oakland. Specifically, Piedmont's northwestern border is adjacent to Oakland's Piedmont Avenue commercial district. The city borders Oakland's historic Grand Lake District (Lakeshore and Grand Avenue commercial districts) to the southwest, the quaint and rustic Montclair District to the northeast, and the Crocker Highlands and Glenview Districts to the south.

=== Major streets ===
Piedmont's major streets include Oakland Avenue, which runs east-west through Piedmont's small city center; Highland Avenue, which divides Piedmont into upper and lower sections; Moraga Avenue, which runs along the city's northern border; and Grand Avenue, which runs near Piedmont's western border and further distinguishes 'Lower' Piedmont (west of Highland Ave) from 'Baja' Piedmont (west of Grand Avenue). Lots in upper Piedmont are, on average, larger than lots in lower Piedmont. A nearby shopping district on Piedmont Avenue is located in Oakland, not Piedmont. A small shopping hamlet had been located on Highland Avenue near the Exedra at Piedmont Park for many years, but in the last few decades has dwindled in number to a small, local grocer-deli (Mulberry's Market), a service station and three banks. No major highways run within Piedmont's borders, but entrances to CA Highway 13 and CA I-580 are quite near.

=== Housing ===
The city is almost entirely zoned for single-family dwelling residential use. Piedmont has minimal commerce compared with statistically similar cities and relies primarily on property taxes and fees for public revenues to support public services. The city also has relatively few multi-family or second (in-law) units. The city has a very small number of businesses in its commercial district on Highland Avenue and a very small number of businesses on Grand Avenue near Piedmont's western border with Oakland.

== Public services ==
Piedmont provides its own fire, police, parks, and recreational services but does not have its own public library nor federal post office; these services are shared with Oakland. Special, incremental property tax assessments on Piedmont real estate for schools and some public services are not shared with Oakland.

== Demographics ==
Historical population
Census	Pop.	Note	%±
1890	634		—
1910	1,719		—
1920	4,282		149.1%
1930	9,333		118.0%
1940	9,866		5.7%
1950	10,132		2.7%
1960	11,117		9.7%
1970	10,917		−1.8%
1980	10,498		−3.8%
1990	10,602		1.0%
2000	10,952		3.3%
2010	10,667		−2.6%
2020	11,270		5.7%
2025 (est.)	10,642	▼	−5.6%
U.S. Decennial Census; 1860–1870 1880-1890; 1900 1910 1920; 1930 1940 1950; 1960 1970 1980; 1990 2000 2010; 2020

=== 2020 census ===
As of the 2020 census, Piedmont had a population of 11,270 and a population density of 6,629.4 inhabitants per square mile (2,559.6/km^{2}). The median age was 45.7 years. 26.5% of residents were under the age of 18, 6.8% were aged 18 to 24, 15.6% were aged 25 to 44, 30.0% were aged 45 to 64, and 21.1% were 65 years of age or older. For every 100 females, there were 96.4 males, and for every 100 females age 18 and over, there were 91.3 males age 18 and over.

The Census reported that 99.9% of the population lived in households, 0.1% lived in non-institutionalized group quarters, and no one was institutionalized. 100.0% of residents lived in urban areas, while 0.0% lived in rural areas.

There were 3,831 households, out of which 44.2% included children under the age of 18. 73.3% were married-couple households, 2.6% were cohabiting couple households, 16.4% had a female householder with no partner present, and 7.6% had a male householder with no partner present. 13.2% of households were one person, and 9.1% were one person aged 65 or older. The average household size was 2.94. There were 3,185 families (83.1% of all households).

There were 3,947 housing units at an average density of 2,321.8 units per square mile (896.5 units/km^{2}), of which 3,831 (97.1%) were occupied. Of these occupied units, 86.4% were owner-occupied and 13.6% were occupied by renters. 2.9% of housing units were vacant; the homeowner vacancy rate was 0.6% and the rental vacancy rate was 2.2%.

Racial composition as of the 2020 census
Race	Number	Percent
White	7,218	64.0%
Black or African American	126	1.1%
American Indian and Alaska Native	10	0.1%
Asian	2,267	20.1%
Native Hawaiian and Other Pacific Islander	13	0.1%
Some other race	177	1.6%
Two or more races	1,459	12.9%
Hispanic or Latino (of any race)	729	6.5%

=== 2023 ACS estimates ===
In 2023, the US Census Bureau estimated that 11.7% of the population were foreign-born. Of all people aged 5 or older, 82.6% spoke only English at home, 1.4% spoke Spanish, 5.1% spoke other Indo-European languages, 9.7% spoke Asian or Pacific Islander languages, and 1.2% spoke other languages. Of those aged 25 or older, 98.9% were high school graduates and 86.8% had a bachelor's degree.

The median household income was more than $250,000, and the per capita income was $143,485. About 2.8% of families and 3.8% of the population were below the poverty line.

== Arts and culture ==
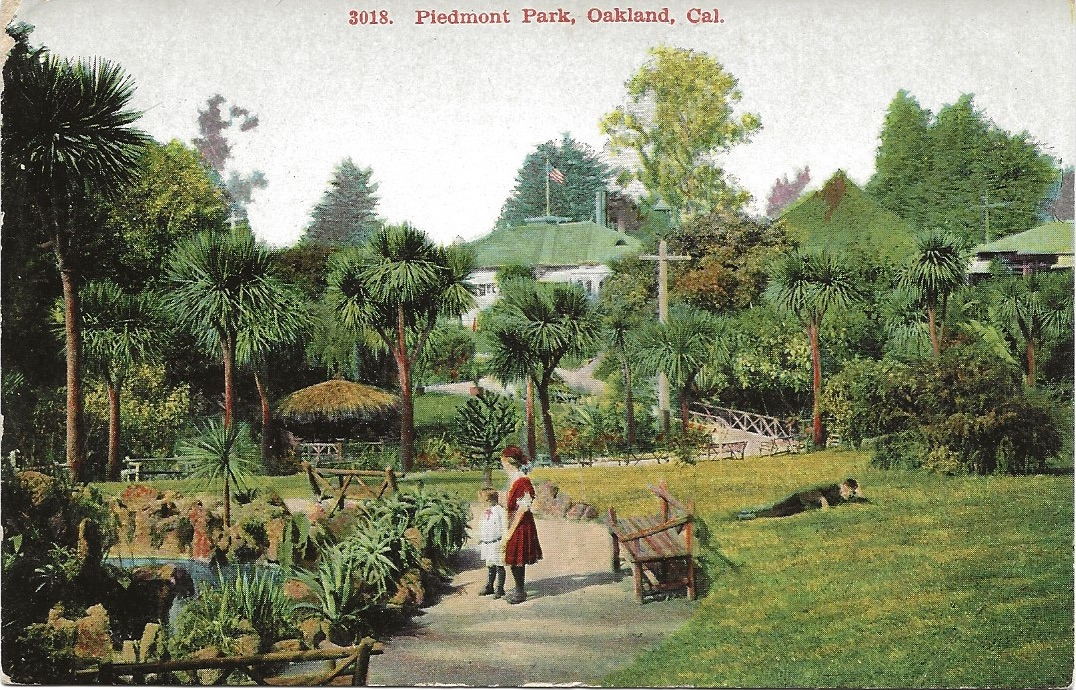
Piedmont Park, Oakland, California

Piedmont has a City Hall, a Community Hall, a Veterans' Memorial Building, a Recreation Center, Aquatics Center, and Center for the Arts. Public parks include Piedmont Park, Dracena Park, Dearing Park, Crocker Park, Hampton Park, Linda Ave Tot Lot and Dog Run, Kennelly Skate Park, and Blair Park. Playfields include Coaches Playfield, Linda Playfield, and Piedmont Sports Field (at Hampton Park).

Regular town events include the July 4 Parade, Movies in the Park, Harvest Festival, Haunted House, Thanksgiving Turkey Trot, and Christmas Tree Lighting. Piedmont High School's annual Bird Calling Contest was previously featured on The Tonight Show Starring Johnny Carson and the Late Show with David Letterman.

Active charities and community groups include the Piedmont Education Foundation, the Piedmont Historical Society, the Piedmont Center for the Arts, the Piedmont Beautification Foundation, the Daughters of the American Revolution (Piedmont Chapter), the Piedmont League of Women Voters, Dress Best for Less, the Piedmont Highlanders Drums & Pipes, the Piedmont Civic Association, the Piedmont Community Church, the Piedmont East Bay Children's Choir, the Piedmont-Montclair Rotary Club, Piedmont Scouting, the Piedmont Baseball Foundation, the Piedmont Basketball Foundation, the Piedmont Soccer Club and the Piedmont Makers. The Children's Support League holds annual Heart of the Home tours of Oakland and Piedmont homes.

== Politics ==
According to the California Secretary of State, as of February 10, 2019, Piedmont has 8,535 registered voters. Of those, 5,082 (59.5%) are registered Democrats, 1,173 (13.7%) are registered Republicans, and 2,022 (23.7%) have declined to state a political party.

From its incorporation until 1992, Piedmont was a Republican stronghold in presidential elections. Since 1992, when Bill Clinton became the first Democrat to win Piedmont, it has trended Democratic.

Piedmont vote by party in presidential elections
Year	Democratic	Republican
2024	86.0% 6,294	11.2% 818
2020	87.7% 7,035	10.6% 851
2016	83.5% 6,013	11.4% 823
2012	74.8% 5,230	23.4% 1,636
2008	78.1% 5,611	20.5% 1,411
2004	72.4% 4,907	26.3% 1,799
2000	61.9% 3,923	33.3% 2,110
1996	54.7% 3,247	36.4% 2,158
1992	52.3% 3,368	33.2% 2,136
1988	46.4% 2,929	52.3% 3,300
1984	37.5% 2,394	61.4% 3,918
1980	24.1% 1,378	61.4% 3,505
1976	26.7% 1,579	71.6% 4,240
1972	28.8% 1,834	69.3% 4,422
1968	26.2% 1,591	70.4% 4,283
1964	36.2% 2,247	63.8% 3,953

== Education ==
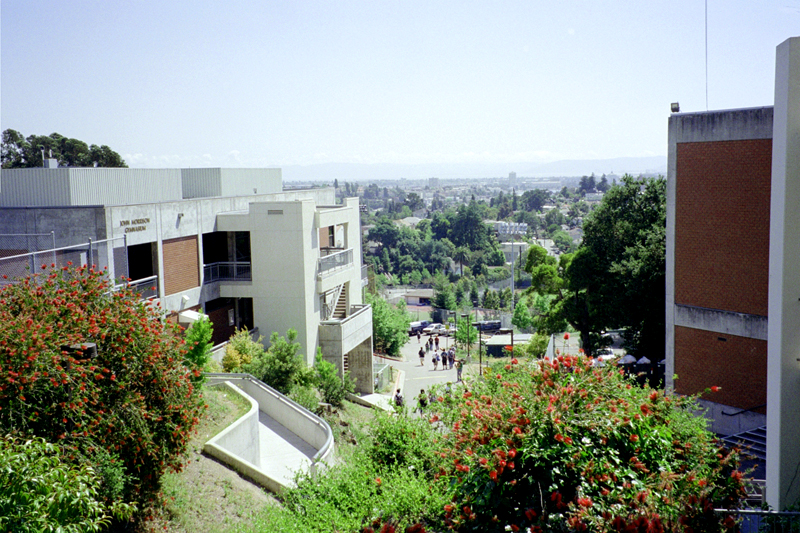
A view of Piedmont Middle School and Witter Field, taken from Piedmont High School

Piedmont Unified School District includes three elementary schools (Havens, Beach, and Wildwood), one middle school (Piedmont Middle School), and two high schools—one larger (Piedmont High School), and one smaller, alternative high school, Millennium High School.

Piedmont voters have approved several local bond measures earmarked for maintaining and/or improving PUSD's educational facilities. For instance, Witter Field, PUSD's sports complex, was rebuilt between 1996 and 1999. The city-owned field adjacent to Beach Elementary School was resurfaced with natural cork-based artificial turf in early 2015. The PUSD-owned artificial turf field at Havens Elementary School (Becker Playfield) was placed in 2010.

Most recently, with the passage of Measure E in 2006, voters authorized the Piedmont Unified School District to issue up to $56 million in bonds to improve Piedmont public school buildings to reduce dangers from earthquakes, eliminate major collapse risks, and to meet or exceed all current state and federal seismic safety standards.

In addition to the public bond measures approved for PUSD facility upgrades and modernization, Piedmont voters have quadrennially approved, since 1980, a supplemental parcel tax (collected annually) which accounts for a very significant portion of PUSD's basic operational budget. In 2005, two measures were approved by voters, one of which renewed the basic school district parcel tax, paying for 21% of the district's budget, and another which added an incremental amount, short-term, to compensate for reduced funding from mainly state, and some federal, sources. Piedmont's most recent school support tax, Measure A, was again approved by 88% of Piedmont voters in 2012. Due to further reductions in state education budgets during the Great Recession (2007-2009), state diversions from local school property tax allocations since 2004, and shifting of state financial responsibilities onto local school districts, Piedmont's local school parcel tax now represents 30% of PUSD's annual operating budget.

Piedmont High School hosts the annual Leonard J. Waxdeck Bird Calling Contest every spring; the top three winners used to appear on the Late Show with David Letterman and perform their bird calls.

The Piedmont Educational Foundation awards a number of grants for academic innovation in Piedmont schools each year, and provides a source of operational funding for the PUSD through its Endowment Fund which reached $6 million in 2015.

== Media ==
The city is served by two local weekly newspapers: the Piedmont Post and the Piedmonter, a neighborhood newspaper organized under the Contra Costa Times news organization. The Piedmont Historical Society publishes a journal, Piedmont's History.

== Transportation ==
AC Transit provides Piedmont with bus service. Bus routes 12 and 33 connect Piedmont to Oakland's BART stations. Route 33 previously served Upper Piedmont going to Estates Drive, but this was discontinued on August 10, 2025. AC Transit also provides a Transbay bus. Route P, to the Transbay Terminal in Downtown San Francisco during peak commute hours.

== Notable people ==
Piedmont is home to a number of notable individuals in the political, business, sports, and academic communities, including: ex-Major League Baseball player David McCarty; ex-National Football League player Bubba Paris, San Francisco 49ers; ex-National Football League player Bill Romanowski; Ambassador to Australia Jeff Bleich; Pete Docter, director of Pixar's Monsters, Inc., Up, and Inside Out and co-writer of WALL-E; Alex Hirsch, the creator of the animated television series Gravity Falls; and Billie Joe Armstrong, lead singer of Green Day. The punk rock band SWMRS also has its roots in Piedmont.

Author Jack London wrote Call of the Wild while living on Blair Avenue in a house that exists today; since this predated incorporation, technically he was never a citizen of Piedmont. John F. Kennedy's Secretary of Defense Robert S. McNamara grew up in Piedmont, where his family lived on Annerley Road. Clint Eastwood resided in Piedmont and attended Piedmont schools. Country Joe McDonald resided in Piedmont in the 1970s. Actors Dean Butler (Little House on the Prairie) also grew up in Piedmont. Notable tennis player and coach Brad Gilbert grew up in Piedmont. Professional male tennis player Mackenzie "Mackie" McDonald grew up in Piedmont and attended Piedmont High School. Charles R. Schwab, founder of the discount stock brokerage firm bearing his name, and his family also lived in Piedmont in the early 1980s, as did Dean G. Witter, founder of the Dean Witter Reynolds brokerage, in the 1940s.

Other residents have included: F. Wayne Valley, philanthropist, construction magnate, owner of the Oakland Raiders and founding member of the AFL; Frank C. Havens, for whom Havens Elementary School is named; and James Gamble, president of the Western Union Telegraph Company, who, in 1877, founded the Piedmont Land Company, introducing the name adopted by the city upon incorporation.

=== Actors, entertainment, and film professionals ===
- Mark Andrews, Academy Award- and Golden Globe-winning film director
- Alice Dinnean, puppeteer
- Clint Eastwood, actor
- Chloe Fineman, actress, comedian Saturday Night Live
- Alex Hirsch, creator of animated series Gravity Falls
- Wes Nisker, radio personality
- Cynthia Stevenson, actress

=== Academia ===
- James Clifford, academia, historian
- Adam J. Matzger, academia, chemist

=== Artists and designers ===
- Alice Beasley (born 1945), American quilter, textile artist
- Micaela Martinez DuCasse, artist
- Erin Fetherston, designer
- Elsie Whitaker Martinez, artist
- Xavier Martínez, artist
- Gyo Obata, architect
- Zhaoming Wu, painter

=== Business ===
- Ruth Leach Amonette, the first woman to become a vice president at IBM. Ruth was raised in and attended high school in Piedmont.
- Robert McNamara, American businessman and Secretary of Defense under President John F. Kennedy
- Arun Sarin, ex-CEO of Vodafone
- George Zimmer, businessman, Men's Wearhouse
- Lip-Bu Tan, businessman, resides in Piedmont.

=== Poets, writers, and journalists ===
- Richard Carlson, author
- William F. Knowland, publisher of The Oakland Tribune
- Joan London, writer
- George Sterling, poet and playwright
- Herman Whitaker, writer

=== Sports ===
- Peter Cornell, NBA player and agent
- Al Davis, football executive
- Sonny Dykes, former head coach of the University of California football team, currently the head coach at Texas Christian University
- Cuonzo Martin, former head coach of the University of California basketball team, currently head coach of the University of Missouri
- Mackenzie McDonald, tennis player
- Ashley Paris, basketball player
- Courtney Paris, basketball player

=== Others ===
- Burton Becker, Piedmont Police Department Chief, Alameda County Sheriff, Ku Klux Klan member and later in life he served as an inmate.
- Sarah Mower Requa, philanthropist and California pioneer
- David C. Waybur, decorated soldier

== See also ==
- List of sundown towns in the United States
