= History of Piedmont, California =

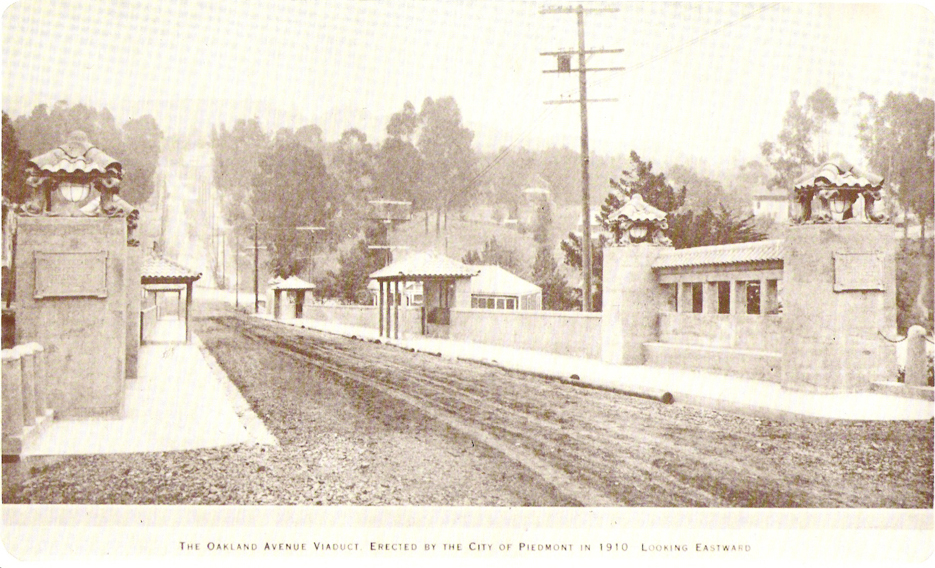
The Oakland Ave viaduct, looking eastward, was erected by the city of Piedmont in 1910.

The history of Piedmont, California, covers the history of the area in California's San Francisco Bay Area that is now known as Piedmont, up to and beyond the legal establishment of a city.

== Pre-hotel era ==
In 1850, what is now Piedmont was part of Rancho San Antonio. This area, owned by the Peralta family, covered much of the northeastern shore of San Francisco Bay, now northern Alameda County. Rancho San Antonio was sparsely populated except for cattle and the vaqueros who tended them.

In 1860, retired South Carolinian Congressman Isaac Holmes bought a piece of land from his neighbor John Reed. The area included Bushy Dell Creek, a creek that runs through the dog-walking trail of modern-day Piedmont. Holmes bathed in the foul-smelling pink water of a nearby spring, believing the water beneficial for his rheumatism.

== Piedmont Springs Hotel ==
In 1870, Walter Blair bought over 800 acres (3.2 km^{2}) of land in the foothills of East Bay. Where the spring was located he built the Piedmont Springs Hotel, of 20 bedrooms and five dining rooms. The water of the spring was thought to have curative powers. Wealthy San Franciscans retired to the hotel during trips to "the country."

In addition to the hotel, Blair built a dairy farm on what is now Highland Avenue and a quarry where Dracena Park is today. He would also go on to establish the Broadway and Piedmont Railroad, which provided transportation to the area via horsecars.

In April 1877, James Gamble bought a 350-acre (1.4 km^{2}) tract of land from Blair, and formed the Piedmont Land Company, along with James deFremery, George W. Beaver, Lucius A. Booth (cousin of Newton Booth), and Timothy L. Barker. The Piedmont Land Company hired landscape engineer William Hammond Hall to plan the avenues and subdivide the tract into 67 parcels. The first auction of land took place on April 10, 1877.

In January 1891, the women of Piedmont led a temperance movement to block the sale of liquor at the Piedmont Springs Hotel. They petitioned the Alameda County Board of Supervisors to withdraw the liquor license granted to the owner of the hotel. Prominent signers included Annie Barton, Anna Richardson, N. Randall, Florence Wing, Inez Craig, M. Laurence, Ethyl Robert, and Mary Gamble.

=== Fire ===
The liquor controversy ended quickly with the Piedmont Springs Hotel fire. On November 17, 1892, sparks from the chimney of the hotel set the roof on fire. Newspapers reported that

The absence of any water supply left the occupants of the doomed building no other recourse than to sit down in the shade and watch the building burn.

Firefighters had to arrive from Oakland, two hours later, at 11:30 a.m., to contain the flames.

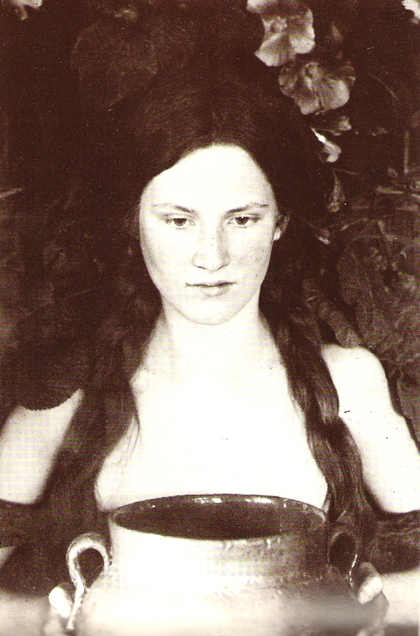
Called "the Blessed Damozel" by George Sterling and photographed here by Laura Adams Armer, Elsie Whitaker served as a "muse" for the Bohemians of Piedmont, and would marry Xavier Martinez.

== Bohemians of Piedmont ==
Jack London married Bess Maddern in 1900, and the newlywed couple settled in a redwood bungalow in the hills east of Oakland. At the time, this area was growing into a community for artists. It was here that London wrote his novel Call of the Wild. London's two daughters, including Joan London, were born during this time.

In 1902, London moved to 206 Scenic Avenue, and "tried to create a childhood he never had," Piedmont historian Ann Swift wrote. He entertained "Peter Pans of both sexes," flew kites, held bubble-blowing contests, and competed to see who could swallow the most soda crackers.

London's friends included fellow Bohemians George Sterling, James Hopper, Herman Whitaker, Xavier Martinez, Blanche Partington, and Charmian Kittredge. After divorcing Bess Maddern London in 1904, he married Kittredge.

The Bohemians were characterized by living non-traditional lifestyles as artists, writers, musicians, and actors. Unlike their wealthier neighbors, the Bohemians of Piedmont could not afford to have their homes constructed for them and instead built them themselves.

== Becoming a city ==
Francis Marion Smith and Frank C. Havens encouraged the development of pre-Piedmont into a city. Smith, who made his fortune on borax, built railroads, especially the East Bay's Key System. Havens headed and was in charge of the Realty Syndicate, which subdivided 13,000 acres (53 km^{2}) of East Bay property. Havens acquired a five-year lease on the Piedmont Springs Park and began a major restoration. In May 1898 the new park was complete.

In 1901, the first post office opened.

In 1908 Havens built an art gallery where the tennis courts are today. Carrie Sterling, estranged wife of George Sterling, nephew of Havens, served as curator.

The population of Piedmont increased fourfold following the 1906 earthquake. San Franciscans fled the City to the hills, which were believed to be safer from earthquakes. To accommodate the growing population, a new city hall and fire station were built a block from the park.

Two elections were held among the citizens of Piedmont in 1907, both of which narrowly upheld the decision for Piedmont to become a city.

By the Roaring Twenties, Piedmont was known as the "City of Millionaires" because it had the most resident millionaires per square mile of any city in the United States. Many of these millionaires built mansions that still stand, notably on Glen Alpine Road/Sotelo Avenue and Sea View Avenue in upper Piedmont. Piedmont became a charter city under the laws of the State of California on December 18, 1922. On February 27, 1923, voters adopted the charter, which can only be changed by another vote of the people.

By the 1920s, Frank Havens had died and Piedmont Park was on the path towards subdivision. Wallace Alexander, who had recently moved to Piedmont from Hawaii with his wife, Mary Alexander, stepped forward. He loaned the city enough to buy the park, and encouraged the Bay Area architect Albert L. Farr to create the Civic Center Plan.

== Civic Center Plan ==
This plan was presented to the community in 1922. It included expanding City Hall, building a city library, and connecting the entrance of Piedmont Park to the electric trolley line, which was the transportation at the time. Of the plan, little did materialize. The exedra, the structure that includes the iconic vase of Piedmont, was built at the head of Piedmont Park. Piedmont High School was built in 1921 and opened to students the following year. It was funded by a bond passed by voters in 1920. However, the stock market crash of 1929 plunged many into financial ruin that kept the rest of the plan, for which bonds had not already been passed, from completion.

== Racial segregation and violence ==
In 1924, the city's first African-American homeowners, Sidney and Irene Dearing, got around the racially restrictive covenants by purchasing a home using a white family member as a proxy. A mob of 500 residents surrounded their home, threatened violence, and demanded that they leave. While the Dearings initially refused to leave, bombs were left around their property. Piedmont's chief of police at the time, Burton Becker, was an active member of the Ku Klux Klan, and could not be counted on to protect them from violent threats against their lives. They were soon forced to sell it to the city.

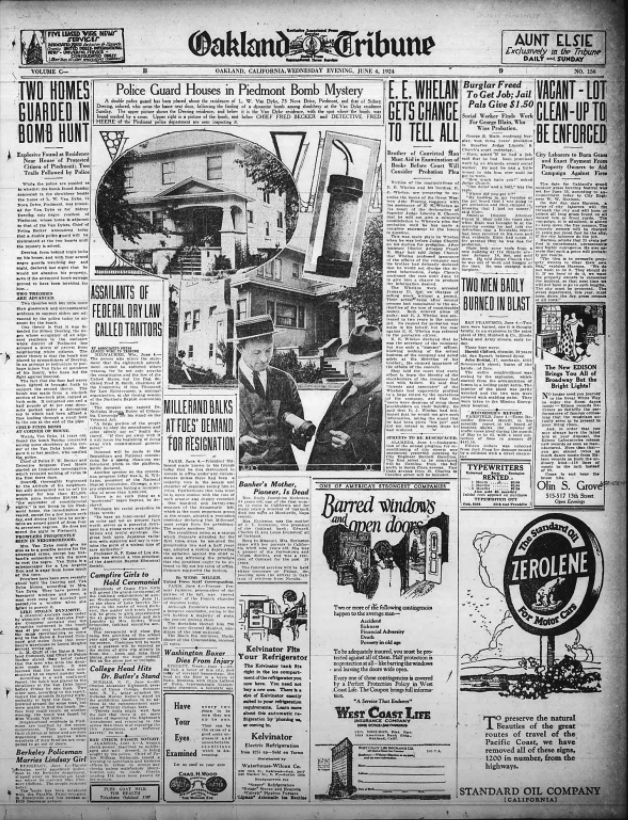
A photograph of the front page of the Oakland Tribune describing bomb threats against Sidney Dearing and his family, the first black homeowners in Piedmont, California

Racially restrictive housing covenants and redlining excluded non-whites for many years. The American sociologist and historian James W. Loewen identified Piedmont as a "probable" sundown town, meaning that non-whites were not welcome after dusk and could face violence and intimidation.

While surrounding Oakland is one of the most ethnically and culturally diverse cities in the United States, attempts to desegregate the city and allow for higher density and affordable housing are typically met with resistance from the city's residents. In early 2021, the city council indicated that it intended "to move forward with public acknowledgement and an apology for the abhorrent treatment Sidney Dearing and his family received in 1924."

== Piedmont High School ==
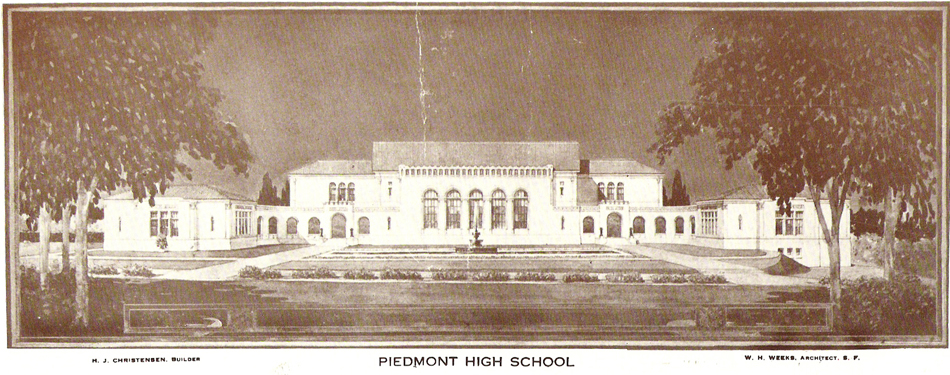
A bond for the creation of Piedmont High School was passed in 1920, and the school was built in 1921.

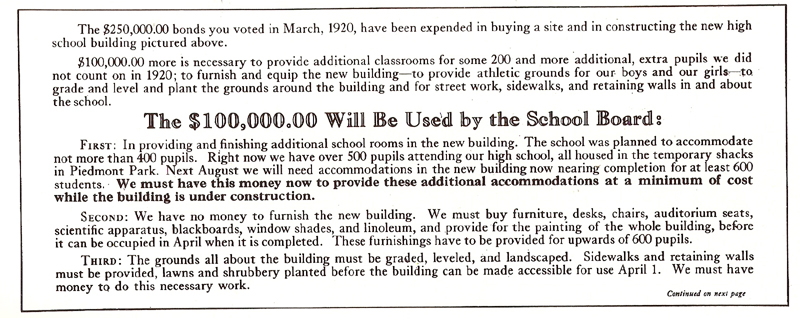
After the school was built for $250,000, it was found that an additional $100,000 was needed.

Up until the creation of the high school, students had attended elementary school in Piedmont, and turned to Oakland for junior and senior high. In September 1922, the Piedmont Unified School District opened the city's first high school. The school was built in 1921 in a neoclassical design, part of the same plan that built the Piedmont city's Exedra. A cafeteria was added in 1923, a library in 1924, and an adjacent junior high in 1926. Since its design by architect W.H. Weeks, the school has undergone several reconstructions, for reasons such as expansion, earthquake retrofitting, and combating dry rot. In 1974, the school was declared unsafe under state earthquake laws. It was demolished, and three new classroom buildings and a gymnasium were built. The original library, quad, and administration buildings were rehabilitated.

In the 1920s the high school offered an equestrian club for students who rode their horses around Piedmont, which was then much less developed than today. Girls wore sailor-suit tops with uniform skirts, boys had a stricter dress code than today, and original artwork decorated the walls of the school.

Ever since its creation, when an additional $100,000 was needed to expand the school, the high school has faced reconstruction numerous times. In the 1970s the breezeway was one of the "back-to-nature"-esque additions made. During the 2003-2004 school years an entrance and trophy room to the gymnasium was added. In 2006, voters passed Measure E, issuing $56 million to earthquake retrofitting of the city's schools.

== See also ==
- Bibliography of California history
