= John D. Drake =

American civil rights attorney (c.1888–1970)

John D. Drake (c. 1888–1970) was a prominent American civil rights attorney and the charter president of the Northern California Branch (also referred to as the Western California Branch and later Oakland Branch) of the National Association for the Advancement of Colored People (NAACP), leading the branch from 1919 until 1927.The Northern California Branch of the NAACP covered the cities of San Francisco, Oakland and Berkeley as well as Alameda county. His leadership was defined by aggressive legal and public campaigns against racial defamation, mob violence, and the expansion of the Ku Klux Klan in California. He was noted as a civil rights champion, a leader in the Oakland, California African American community, and a pioneering distinguished attorney who led many significant legal battles.

== Early life and education ==
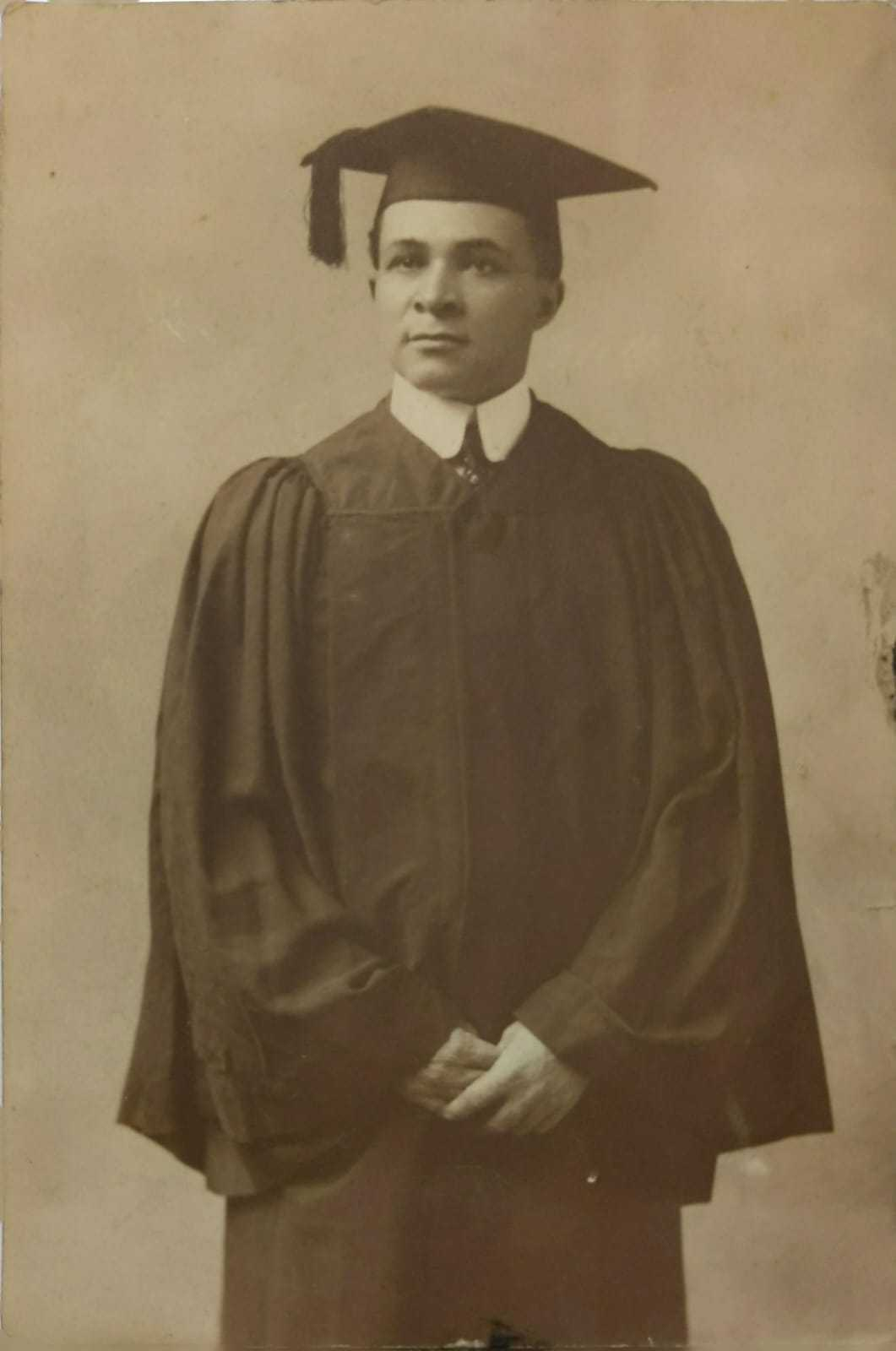
John D. Drake's graduation from Howard Law School in 1915

Drake was born on February 19, 1988, in Marlboro county, South Carolina to Thomas Drake and Mary Henegan, who were farmers. Drake completed his undergraduate studies at Benedict College in Columbia, South Carolina, and earned his law degree from Howard University Law School in Washington, D.C. in 1915. Following his graduation, he went home to Bennettsville, South Carolina, and then traveled to Iowa where he completed a one-year apprentice program with an attorney before relocating to Oakland, California, where he began practicing law in 1917.

== Civil rights and NAACP leadership ==
=== Fighting the Ku Klux Klan and propaganda ===
In 1921, Drake, as president of the Northern California Branch of the NAACP, wrote to the San Francisco Mayor, James Rolph, Jr., to protest the planned screening of the film The Birth of a Nation, highlighting its potential to incite racial terror. Drake credited as the catalyst who rallied the Black community to protest the airing of the film. Drake advocated to ban the film on the grounds that it was a "malicious misrepresentation" of African Americans that glorified lynching. Drake argued that the airing of the film, "engenders strife and discord where all before was peace and harmony, thereby destroying the helpful and friendly relations that should exist between the races". He followed this by petitioning the city to ban face masks in San Francisco as an anti-Klan tactic. His opposition to the Ku Klux Klan (KKK) also involved successfully fighting their efforts to incorporate in California, at least the male version of the KKK. In 1921, he argued to Frank C. Jordon, California Secretary of State should deny the incorporation request of the KKK on the grounds that the organization was "founded on principles that are subversive to the principles on which our government and institutions are founded". He succeeded in blocking the KKK from being incorporated in California. Drake coordinated with the national NAACP office, requesting materials from Assistant Secretary Walter White to assist in opposing the film's exhibition. His efforts and tactics were shared with other chapters of the NAACP, including the Boston branch. In his 1921 letter to the Sonora Banner (a newspaper based in Sonora California), Drake warns that "no man can advocate discrimination against such a people without proving himself void of a sense of justice." In December 1922, Drake protested the incorporation of the Women of the Ku Klux Klan, arguing the name itself was prima facie evidence of its connection to the infamous Klan. California Secretary of State, Frank C. Jordan, replied that while he was "absolutely in sympathy" with Drake's sentiments, he was legally bound to file the articles of incorporation if they met technical requirements, unlike the male Klan organization where he had more discretion.

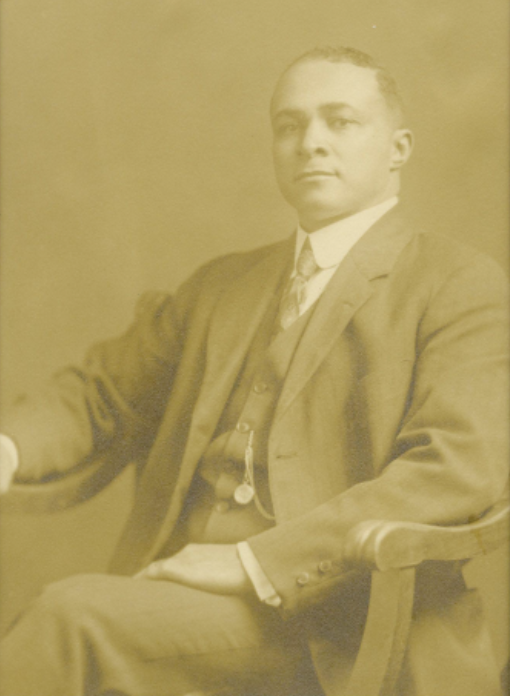
Portrait of John D. Drake, date unknown during 1920s

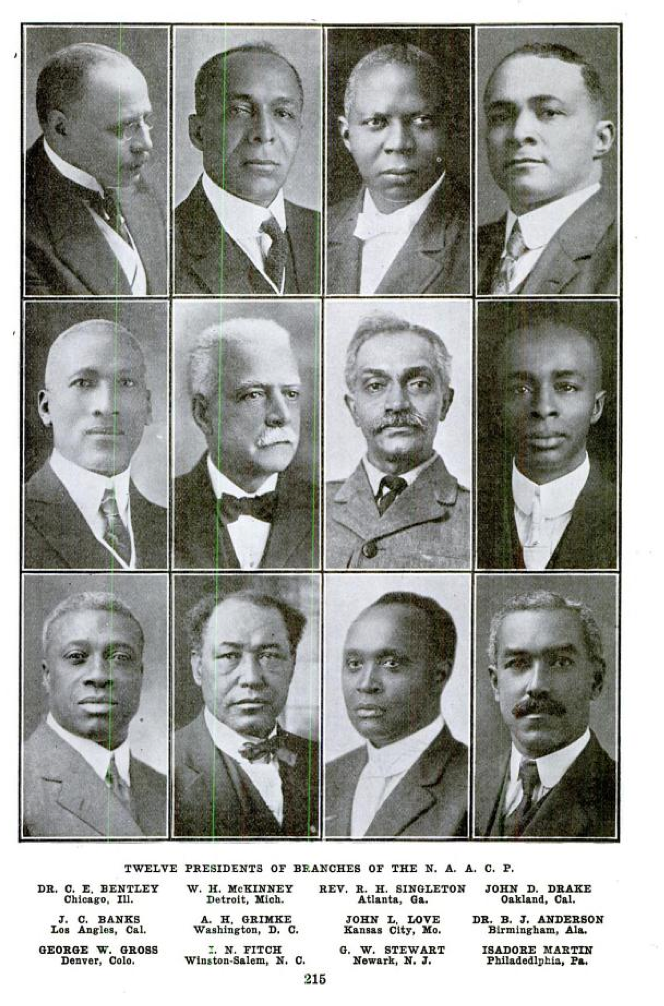
Twelve Presidents of NAACP Branches in early 20th Century in United States

=== Anti-lynching advocacy (1922) ===
Drake was a vocal advocate for the Dyer Anti-Lynching Bill (a federal bill originally introduced by Missouri congressman Leonidas Dyer in 1918, passed by the House in 1922 and blocked by the Senate), helping to advocate for the bill in the press and with elected representatives. On December 10, 1920, a vigilante mob staged a lynching in a cemetery near Santa Rosa. This prompted Drake to draft a proposal to make lynching a federal offense. He helped persuade Rep. Leonidas C. Dyer (R-Missouri), to take the landmark proposal to the floor of Congress in 1921. In May 1922, he published an article titled "A Call to Arms" in The Oakland Voice, rallying the East Bay community to support Congressman Dyer's fight against mob violence, and also organized and held a successful rally in the Oakland Civic Auditorium to support the Dyer legislation, called the Dyer Mass Meeting.

==== The Sidney and Irene Dearing case (1924) ====
This key case, early in his career gained national attention. Drake represented Sidney and Irene Dearing, an African American businessman who purchased a home in the all-white suburb of Piedmont, California. After a mob of 500 white residents surrounded the home and the city threatened eminent domain, Drake, as the Dearing's attorney and president of the Northern California branch of the NAACP, publicly challenged the city's action. He argued that the attempt to seize the property disregarded Dearing's constitutional rights "simply on the ground of his color". This case and similar incidents during this period, for example, the Bruce's Beach case in Los Angeles see Bruce's Beach, exemplify the widespread post-World War I tactics of using exclusionary zoning, racial covenants, violence, and city condemnation to prevent Black families from moving into all-white neighborhoods, demonstrating that this was a national phenomenon, not isolated to the South. In February 2026, a descendant of Sidney and Irene Dearing filed a compliant in Alameda County Superior Court alleging that the City of Piedmont committed fraud against the Dearings when it took action by eminent domain under the false pretenses of building a road, and is seeking compensation.

=== Challenging housing discrimination and exclusionary racial practices ===
In addition to the Dearing case, Drake fiercely advocated for others who were threatened or forced out of all-white neighborhoods in the Bay Area. He also successfully argued the case of Brown against the Leighton's Restaurant Company, a case that fought against a corporation that refused service to a Black customer on account of his color.

=== Advocacy for civil rights laws ===
He drafted an amendment to the Civil or Personal Rights Acts of California, which raised the minimum damages for discrimination against colored citizens in public accommodations from fifty to one hundred dollars.

=== Defense of civil rights and citizenship ===
Drake actively engaged with the press to refute racist narratives. In June 1921, Drake published a scathing response to an article by editor Charles S. Jones that claimed the gatherings of African Americans bred crime. Drake cited police records from New York City and Buxton, Iowa, to prove that crime rates among African Americans were often lower than those of whites, arguing that crime was a result of environment rather than race. He defended the "moral and criminal status" of African Americans by highlighting their military service, noting that 350,000 African Americans volunteered in the Civil War and 300,000 served in World War I to protect the nation. He asserted that the "Negro is a full-fledged citizen" entitled to equal justice.

=== Community mobilization ===
He organized a membership drive, calling on local pastors to assist in enrolling members in the NAACP to support the legislative fight against lynching.

=== Support for Black economic development ===
In the 1950s Drake also turned his attention to helping to improving the economic outcomes for African Americans. He helped organize the Oakland Black business union and attended the First Negro Business Forum in Oakland.

== Historical significance ==
John Drake's letter to San Francisco Mayor James Rolph Jr. on June 3, 1921 was sent just days after the Tulsa Race Massacre (May 31–June 1, 1921). His letter highlighted the glorification of the Ku Klux Klan in the file, The Birth of a Nation, and its potential to incite racial violence. Drake's letter is prime example of the type of appeals made by African American leaders to city officials in this time period. It also highlights the NAACP's strategic approach to fighting against racist propaganda. The campaign against The Birth of a Nation showed there was a high degree of cooperation among San Francisco Bay Area Black leaders. In addition, the controversy over the airing of the film forced many key city local San Francisco Bay Area officials to take a stand for the first time on a major race issue. The efforts of John Drake were successful and in 1921, the San Francisco supervisors took action to ban the airing of The Birth of a Nation, and in the same year, the state of California temporarily banned the film.

In addition to the United States being in the middle of the Spanish flu pandemic, 1919 saw a deluge of lynchings and mob violence that became known as the "Red Summer". The revived Ku Klux Klan and its members began to use the costume created for the klansmen in The Birth of a Nation. The white robes and hoods became their uniform, and their ranks steadily grew in this time period into the millions. By 1921, the Klan's robes and hoods had become so recognizable that John Drake followed his unsuccessful bid to stop the showing of the film with his petition to the city to ban face masks in San Francisco, which became an anti-Klan tactic around the country.

In 1924, the same year Drake and Lawrence Sledge represented the Dearing family in Piedmont, the KKK held a rally of 8,500 people in the Oakland auditorium. The Dearing family was driven out of their home after a mob of 500 marched on their home and bombs were left on their property. It was reported that the Piedmont police chief, Burton F. Becker, the head of the local Klan, did not protect the family from this violence.

== Impact on Oakland California ==
While Drake's impact was felt in the San Francisco Bay Area and nationwide, he particularly helped to shape Oakland California's legal community, civic life and economy. When a charter member of the local NAACP branch, Ida Louise Jackson, was unable to obtain a teaching position in the Oakland public schools, Drake and his colleagues intervened on her behalf. Facing an imminent threat of lawsuit, the district made Jackson its first Black teacher in 1925. Drake successful forced the district attorney to crack down on a rash of police brutality in West Oakland's thriving jazz district along Seventh Street. In 1933, attended the First Negro Business Forum in Oakland. C.L. Dellums and Walter Gordon were also in attendance. C.L. Dellums succeeded Drake as president of the NAACP Oakland Branch and Gordon succeeded him.

Civil Rights Attorneys that came after John Drake, such as John Burris who arrived in Oakland just after the death of John Drake, credit John Drake as leading the way for attorneys and civil rights leaders to come.

== Professional life ==
Drake was one of the founders of the Charles Houston Law Club, together with his colleague Lawrence Sledge, as well as McCants Stewart, Edward Mabson, Leland Hawkins, and Annie Virginia Stephens Coker. Each were pioneering Black attorneys in the East Bay/Oakland area of the San Francisco Bay Area. Overall, he practiced law for 32 years in Alameda county, California. He was a member of the Men of Tomorrow, Inc. and was a lifelong Republican, owing from their assistance with his anti-lynching bill and other support of his causes. He was an Associate Pastor of North Oakland Baptist Church, member of the Alameda County Bar Association, and member of the California Bar Association.

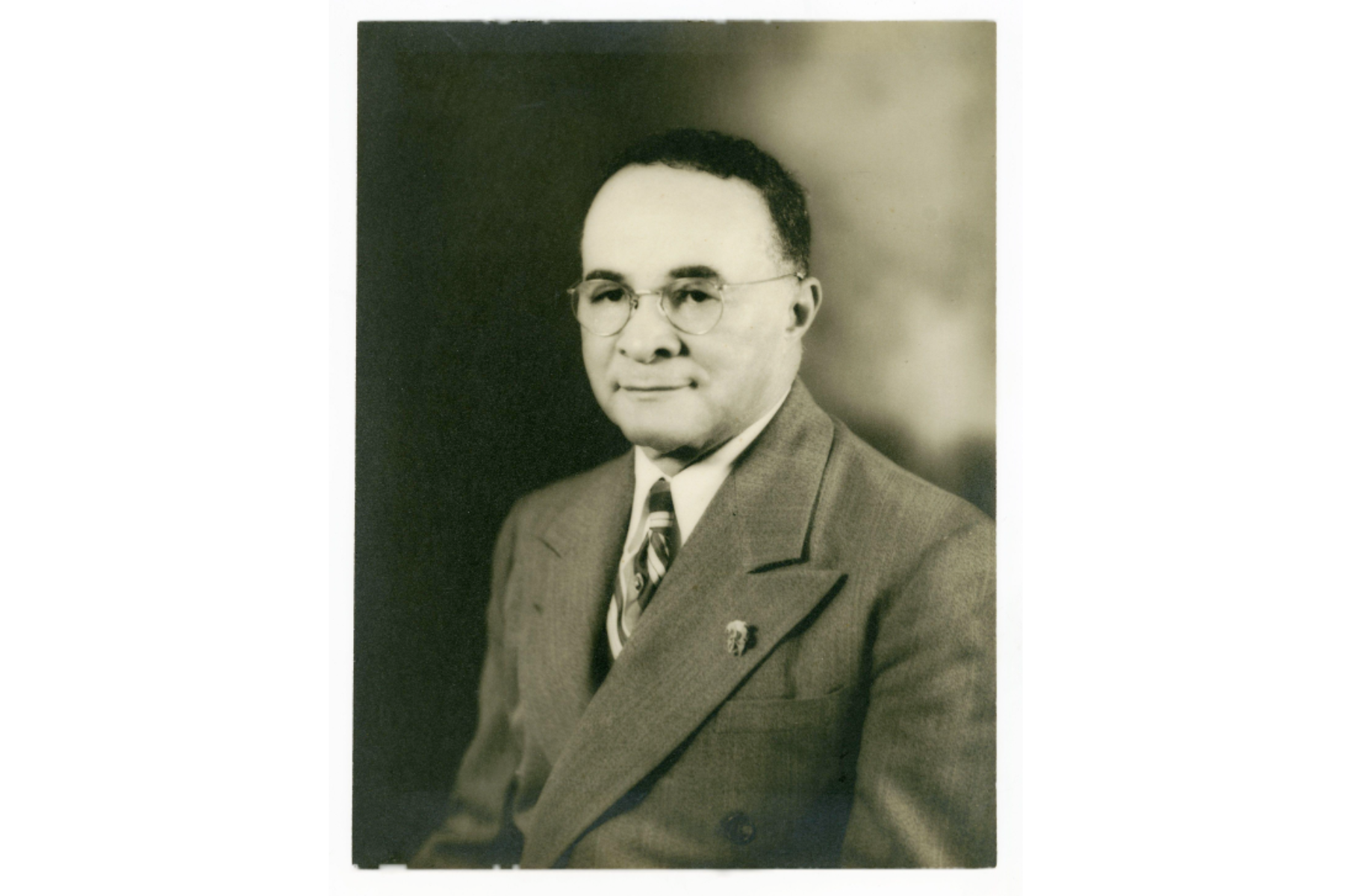
John D. Drake in the 1950s

== Family ==
He was married to Willette Martin (Drake) (1901–1986), who was also a very accomplished leader in the Oakland community and founding member of the local Bay Area chapter of Jack and Jill of America, and was associated with St. Augustine's Episcopal Church. Willette and John had one daughter, Joan Drake Brown.

Drake died on April 2, 1970 and is interred together with Willette in Oakland California. Funeral services were held at North Oakland Baptist Church.
