= Frank Havens =

Frank Havens may refer to:

- Frank C. Havens (1848–1918), American lawyer
- Frank Havens (canoeist) (1924–2018), American canoeist
