= The Planter =

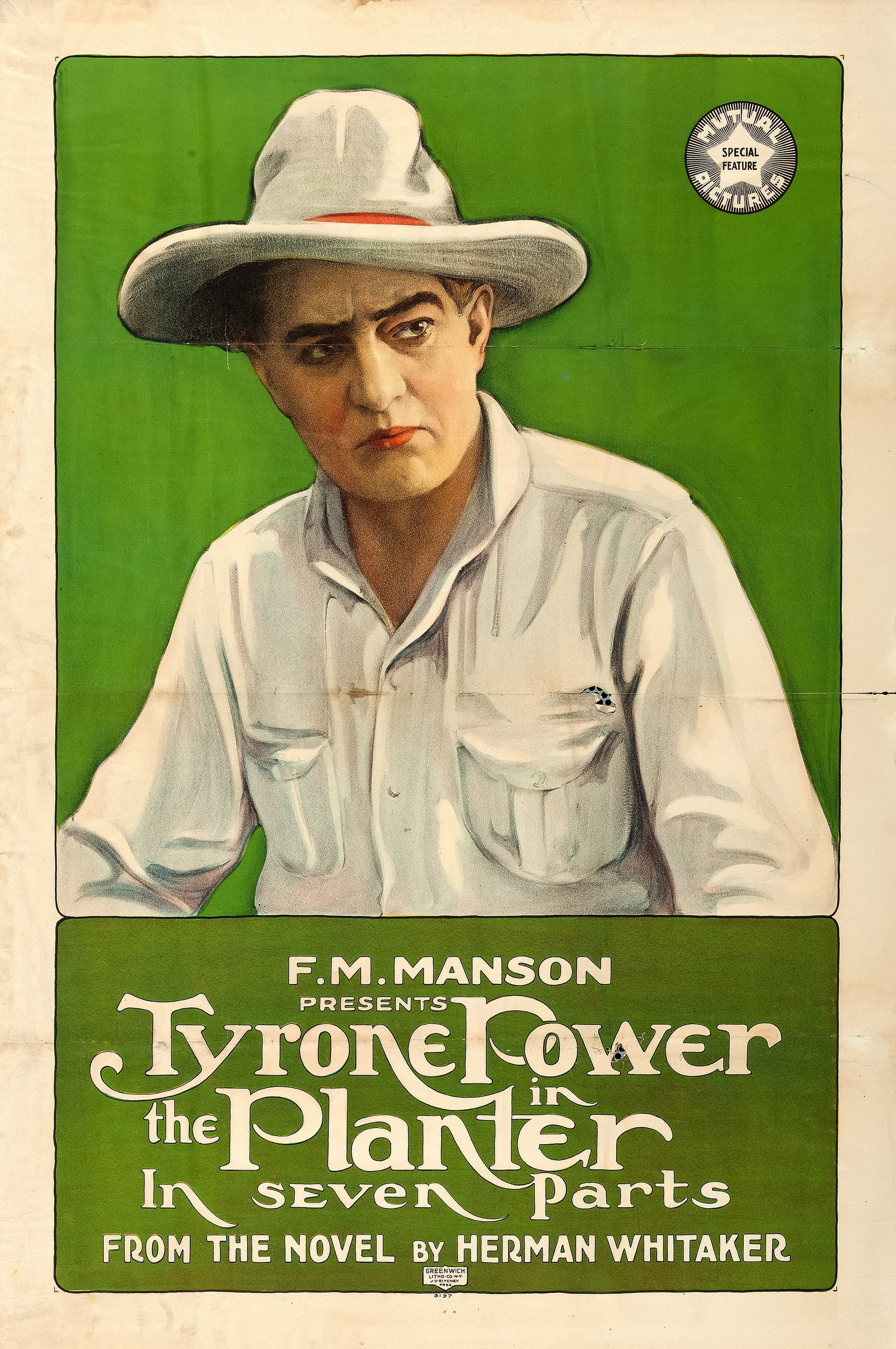
- Lobby poster
- Directed by: Thomas N. Heffron; John Ince
- Written by: Harry C. Drum (scenario)
- Based on: The Planter by Herman Whitaker
- Produced by: F. M. Manson; Harry C. Drum
- Cinematography: George W. Lawrence; H. M. Hawkins
- Distributed by: Mutual Film Company
- Release date: August 1917
- Running time: 5 reels
- Country: United States
- Language: Silent (English intertitles)

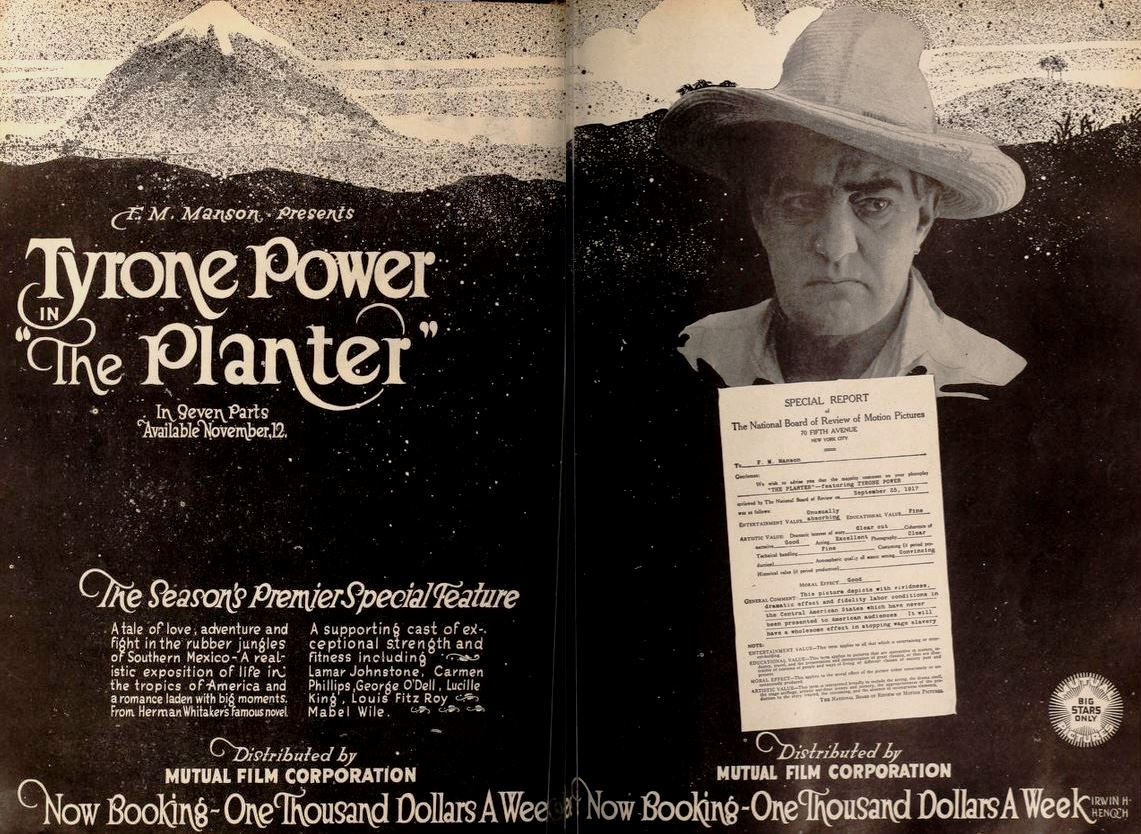
Contemporary advert

The Planter is a lost 1917 American silent drama film directed by Thomas N. Heffron and John Ince. It was produced by F. N. Manson and Harry Drum and distributed through Mutual.

== Cast ==
- Tyrone Power Sr. as Ludwig Hertzer (credited as Tyrone Power)
- Lamar Johnstone as David Mann
- Mrs. Tyrone Power as Consuela (credited as Helen Bateman)
- Lucille King as Andrea
- Mabel Wiles as Patricia
- Pearl Elmore as Senora Morales
- Lalo Encinas as Magdaleno
- George O'Dell as Yaqui Chief (credited as George R. O'Dell)
- Alice Winchester as Yaqui Chief's Sister
- James Donald as Yaqui Father
- Louis Fitzroy a George Ewing
- Grace Whitehead as Mrs. Ewing
- Pat Hartigan as Andy Meagher (credited as P.C. Hartigan)
- Laura Winston as Elizabeth Mann
- Lottie Kruse as Kate Sommers

== Production ==
Originally, exterior scenes were supposed to be taken in Central America, but they were described as being "far from successful." The scenes were retaken in the Pasadena foothills, nearby the Pasadena studio which was first built by Crown City Company.
