= Micaela Martínez DuCasse =

Historic hotel in California, U.S.

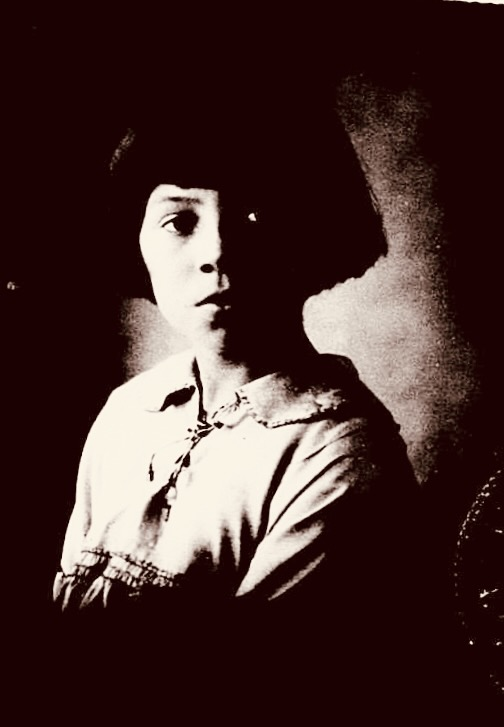
- Micaela Martinez (1922)
- Born: Micaela Martínez DuCasse; August 26, 1913; San Francisco, California, US
- Died: May 5, 1989 (aged 75); Oakland, California, US
- Occupation(s): artist, author, educator
- Spouse(s): Ralph DuCasse (m. 1944–?; divorced)
- Children: 2

Micaela Martínez DuCasse (1913–1989) was an American artist, author, and educator, known for her murals and sculptures. She was the daughter of Elsie Whitaker Martinez and painter Xavier Martínez. From 1955 to 1978 she taught at the San Francisco College for Women.

== Biography ==
Martínez was born on August 26, 1913, in San Francisco, California, to Elsie Whitaker and painter Xavier Martínez. Although her father was born in Mexico, he never spoke Spanish at home and never taught her. She started drawing at the age of 3, studying with her father. At the age of 7 she expressed wanting to become a religious painter. Neither of her parents were particularly religious but she was sent to attend classes at the Catholic convent. At age 14 she enrolled in classes at California School of Arts and Crafts (now known as the California College of the Arts or CCA) in Oakland. At CCA she studied sculpture with Ralph Stackpole and showed natural talent.

From 1955 to 1978, she was a Lecturer and taught Liturgical Art classes at San Francisco College for Women at Lone Mountain. She also served as a Lecturer at Holy Names University (previously College of the Holy Names) in Oakland. She had been active in the Regional Oral History Office at the Bancroft Library, University of California, Berkeley.

After she got out of art school she painted the murals for the library for the Franciscans in San Francisco. She was commissioned to work on the seminarians' library at the San Luis Rey Mission. All the walls are covered with murals done in a fresco style. They were completed, prepared and then sent down to San Luis Rey. And then she's made Stations of the Cross for the San Antonio Mission in oils. And she did a very fine sculptural set of the Stations of the Cross for the cloister of the Franciscan Sisters. The outstanding paper of Catholic art in New York, the Liturgical Arts Society, have reproduced her murals for the Franciscan Library in San Francisco and the painting in the Navy Chapel. It was then, of course, that the seal was set on liturgical artists – when they appeared in this now famous New York Liturgical Art Society. So she was well known by the time she was twenty-two, as a religious painter. Later, she painted the twelve foot figure of the Ascending Christ for the Navy Chapel on Treasure Island.

— Elsie Whitaker Martinez

== Death ==
She died on May 5, 1989, in Oakland, California at the age of 75. She was survived by two daughters and three grandchildren. Funeral services were held at the Carmelite Monastery in Carmel. She was buried at St. Andrew's Priory at the Benedictine Monastery at Valyermo, in the Mojave Desert.

== Personal life ==
In 1944, she married artist Ralph DuCasse (1916–2003); however the marriage ended in divorce. Together they had two daughters, with their daughter Jeanne McCreary becoming an artist. She lived in her childhood home at 324 Scenic Avenue in Piedmont, California until her death. This was where she maintained her art studio.

== Bibliography ==
- DuCasse, Micaela; Riess, Suzanne B. (1985). Renaissance of Religious Art and Architecture in the San Francisco Bay Area, 1946–1968. Berkeley, CA: Regional Oral History Office of the Bancroft Library.
