= Not Exactly Gentlemen =

1931 film

- Theatrical release poster
- Directed by: Benjamin Stoloff
- Screenplay by: Dudley Nichols; William Conselman
- Based on: Over the Border by Herman Whitaker
- Starring: Victor McLaglen; Fay Wray; Lew Cody; Robert Warwick; Eddie Gribbon; David Worth
- Cinematography: Daniel B. Clark
- Edited by: Milton Carruth
- Production company: Fox Film Corporation
- Distributed by: Fox Film Corporation
- Release date: March 8, 1931
- Running time: 70 minutes
- Country: United States
- Language: English

Not Exactly Gentlemen is a 1931 American pre-Code Western film directed by Benjamin Stoloff and written by Dudley Nichols and William Conselman. It is based on the 1917 novel Over the Border by Herman Whitaker. It stars Victor McLaglen, Fay Wray, Lew Cody, Robert Warwick, Eddie Gribbon, and David Worth. Fox Film Corporation released it on March 8, 1931.

Some theaters used the title Three Rogues. Whitaker's novel had previously been adapted for the silent feature film Three Bad Men (1926).

== Plot ==
The story is set in the Dakota Territory during the period leading up to the Great Dakota Boom land rush and specifically references the Black Hills gold rush of 1877. The narrative centers on three outlaws: Bull Stanley, Ace Beaudry, and Bronco Dawson. They possess rough exteriors and engage in criminal activities, but operate by their own code of honor. The narrative explores themes of redemption arc, sacrifice, and the rough-hewn morality sometimes present on the early American frontier.

As settlers move westward, drawn by the promise of free land, the trio initially sees a prime opportunity for theft, particularly targeting horse herds accompanying the wagon trains. Their plans change when they encounter Lee Carlton. Her father, Bruce Carlton, was leading a group of settlers toward a fertile valley he intended to claim. He has just been murdered by the ruthless gunman Layne Hunter and his gang. Hunter coveted the horses Carlton possessed and also sought to eliminate any competition for the desirable land.

The three outlaws find Lee orphaned beside her father's wagon and are unexpectedly moved by her plight. Abandoning their predatory intentions, they vow to protect her and ensure she can fulfill her father's dream by reaching the valley and staking her claim when the territory officially opens. They become her unlikely guardians, shielding her from the dangers of the trail and the continued threat posed by Hunter, who is determined that Lee should not reach her destination.

Along the way, Lee meets and develops a romantic relationship with Dan O'Malley, a forthright young man and possibly a surveyor or newspaperman, who joins their company and supports Lee's cause.

The story culminates in the chaotic spectacle of the land rush. Thousands of settlers on horseback, in wagons, and on foot, surge across the starting line to claim parcels of land. Lee and Dan race toward the valley her father had chosen, pursued relentlessly by Layne Hunter and his men. Realizing they cannot outrun Hunter indefinitely and protect Lee simultaneously, the three outlaws make a pact to sacrifice themselves. In a series of delaying actions, Bull, Ace, and Bronco confront Hunter's gang, using their fighting skills and frontier knowledge to hold back the pursuers. Each man falls in turn, gaining precious time for Lee and Dan.

Due to their guardians' ultimate sacrifice, Lee and Dan reach the valley first and successfully stake their claim. Hunter is presumably killed or defeated in the final confrontations. Lee Carlton, though mourning the loss of her protectors, secures her future on the land her father envisioned, ready to build a new life with Dan, made possible by the selfless actions of the three men who were not exactly gentlemen.

== Cast ==
- Victor McLaglen as Bull Stanley
- Fay Wray as Lee Carleton
- Lew Cody as Ace Beaudry
- Robert Warwick as Layne Hunter
- Eddie Gribbon as Bronco Dawson
- David Worth as Bruce Randall
- Joyce Compton as Ace's Girl
- Louise Huntington as Bronco's Girl
- Franklyn Farnum as Nelson
- Carol Wines as Bull's Girl
- Jim Farley as Marshal Dunn

== Production ==
Not Exactly Gentlemen was developed by Fox Film Corporation, with the working titles Land Rush, Three Rough Diamonds, and Three Bad Men. It is a sound film remake of Fox's successful 1926 silent film, The Three Bad Men. Both films are adaptations of the 1917 novel Over the Border by Herman Whitaker. The studio assigned Benjamin Stoloff to direct the sound film. It was written by Dudley Nichols and William Conselman. Fox filed copyright number LP2018 on February 9, 1931, and released the film on March 8, 1931, with a running time of about 60 minutes. Fox was the distributor.

== Reception ==
The March 7, 1931, issue of trade magazine Harrison's Reports calls it "A very good melodrama of the pioneer days. The action is fast and interesting, thanks to the characterizations of the three actors".

In 2009, the UCLA Film & Television Archive restored and cataloged the film, and wrote, "Wray's Carleton proves the perfect counterpoint to the roguish trio [...] The mayhem that ensues culminates in a hilariously protracted horse and wagon stampede that must be seen to be believed. Slapstick veterans Lew Cody and Eddie Gribbon provide further comic relief while Wray and Victor McLaglen share a smoldering chemistry."
