= Elsie Whitaker Martínez =

Canadian-born American Bohemian artist and muse

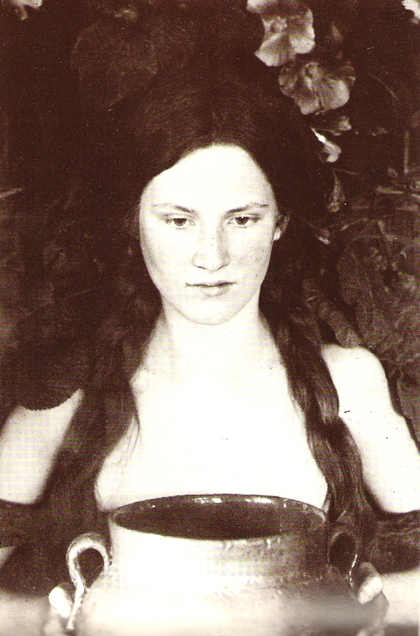
- This portrait of Elsie Whitaker was taken around 1907 by Laura Adams Armer.
- Born: Elsie Whitaker; March 1, 1890; Manitoba, Canada
- Died: January 31, 1984 (aged 93); San Francisco, California, United States
- Known for: Bohemian artist, muse
- Spouse: Xavier Martínez
- Children: Micaela Martínez DuCasse
- Father: Herman Whitaker

Elsie Whitaker Martínez (1 March 1890 – 31 January 1984) was renowned for her beauty in youth and old age, a muse of many famed writers and artists and an associate of most people in Northern California's Bohemian community of 1906 into the 1920s. Piedmont Bohemian George Sterling called her "the Blessed Damozel."

== Early life ==
Elsie Whitaker was born on March 1, 1890, in Manitoba, Canada, daughter of novelist and war correspondent Herman Whitaker and his wife, Margaret A. Vandecar (1868-1905).

In 1902, she and her family moved to the hills of Piedmont, California, to the "Silk Culture House" at the end of Mountain Avenue. She went to Piedmont grammar school and spent two years Oakland High School. She loved books and studied European history, drama, and literature. By age 16, Whitaker was a "free-spirited artist."

At sixteen I was a blonde beauty, medium height, lithe and slim, with perfect features that our artist friends called classic Greek; and some, inclined to romanticism, declared I resembled the Blessed Damozel; of Rossetti. But to our Piedmonters and our friends, used to seeing me flitting about the hills with my long golden braids, I was the little Valkyrie.

— Elsie Whitaker Martinez

Elsie met painter Xavier Martínez (1869–1943) at Coppa's Restaurant in San Francisco. Finding her a perfect subject, he sketched her and began his Elsie series. After the earthquake of 1906, Martínez moved to Piedmont. Months later, he proposed to an 18-year-old Whitaker, who had already promised to marry at least four other men, all friends of her father. Choosing Martínez, she said, "I decided to pick the one who would give me the most interesting life." Martínez, at 37, was only two years younger than Elsie's father Herman Whitaker. The couple married on October 17, 1907, in San Francisco. She spent summers with Xavier while he taught classes between 1913 and 1940.

Xavier and Elise had a daughter on August 13, 1913, Micaela (1913–1989), who became a fine artist. Micaela studied with Victor Arnautoff and sculpture with Ralph Stackpole; she later studied stone cutting with Ruth Cravath. In 1944, she married artist Ralph DuCasse and changed her name to Micaela Martínez DuCasse.

== Later life ==
In 1908, Elise and Xavier stayed with Perry Newberry in Carmel-by-the-Sea, California, when Xavier taught classes in the California School of Arts and Crafts. She was active in work on the restoration of the Carmel Mission.

In 1916, Harriet Dean, a friend of Emma Goldman's,, met Xavier and Elsie Martínez, while Dean was working at The Little Review, which was published, for a while, in San Francisco (after Chicago, for a while, Margaret C. Anderson and Jane Heap published The Little Review out of a ranch in Muir Woods, in southwestern Marin County, California, in the San Francisco Bay Area, before moving to New York's Greenwich Village in 1917, then Margaret C. Anderson took it to Paris).

In 1922, Harriet Dean's mother gave a trip to Europe, to Harriet, Kai, and Elsie, and they spent a year in France.

In 1923, Elsie and Xavier Martínez separated and she moved into the house of Harriet Dean,

In 1939, Elise, Harriet, and Kai moved to Carmel. In 1941, Xavier became ill, so they took him to Carmel. He was with them for seven months before he died on January 13, 1943.

In 1962 and 1963, Elsie was interviewed extensively for the Regional Oral History Office as a part of a series on San Francisco Bay Area artistic and cultural history. The interview was undertaken at the request of James D. Hart, Professor of English, who served as faculty advisor. One of the interviewers, Franklin Dickerson Walker, interviewed Elise at her house in Carmel on the corner of 17th Avenue and El Carmelo Street. In this interview she shared her memories, papers, and scrapbooks.

In 1981, Elsie moved to San Francisco, after living for many years in Carmel.

== Death ==
Elsie died on January 31, 1984, at St. Anne's Home in San Francisco following a brief illness. She was 93. She is buried at San Carlos Cemetery in Monterey, California.

== Gallery ==
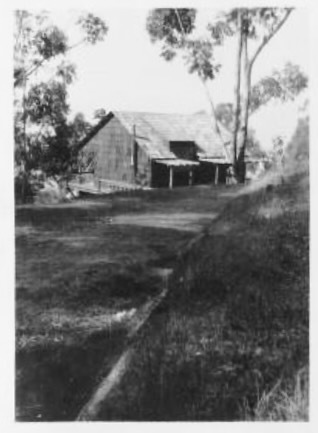
Marty's Studio, Piedmont

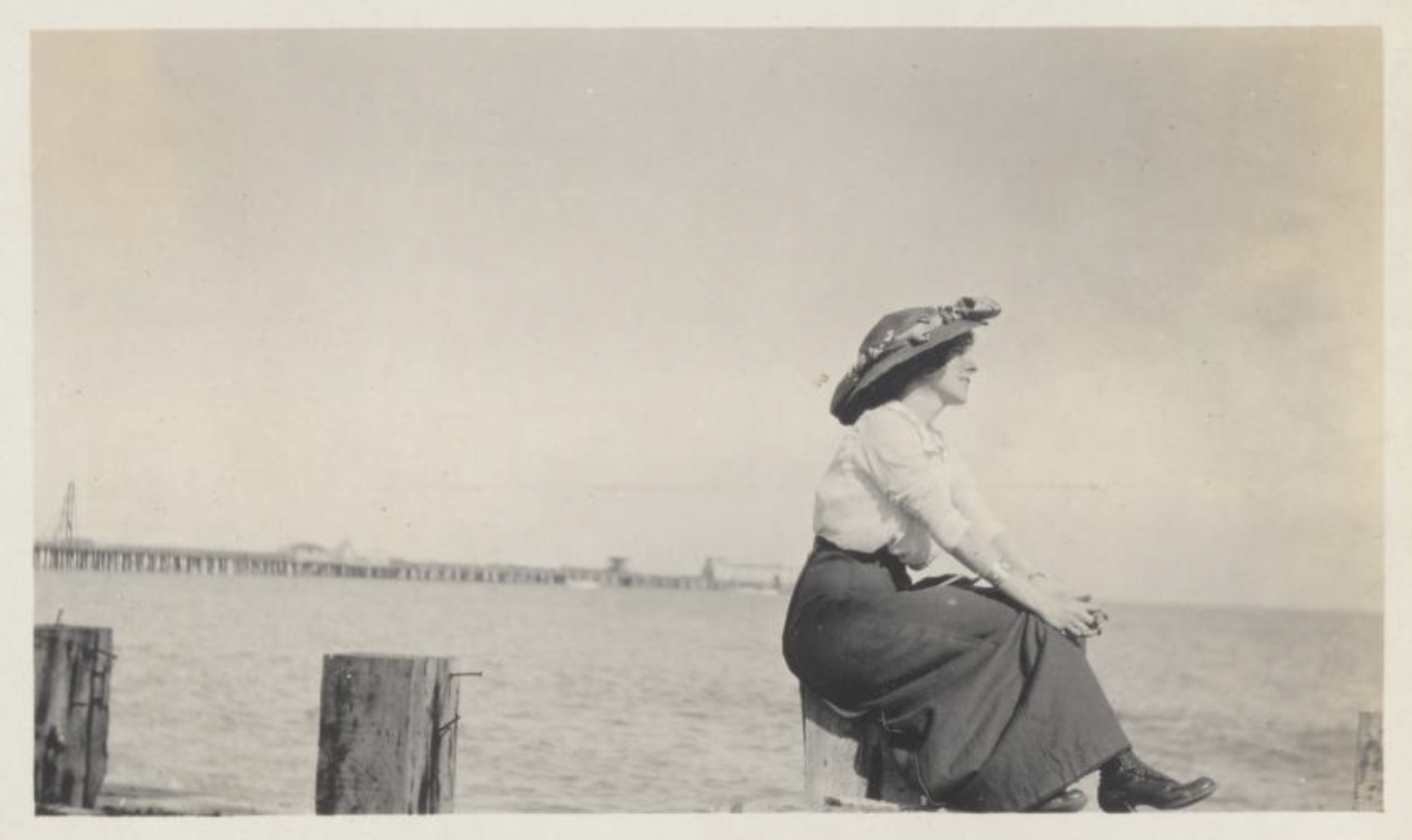
Elsie Whitaker

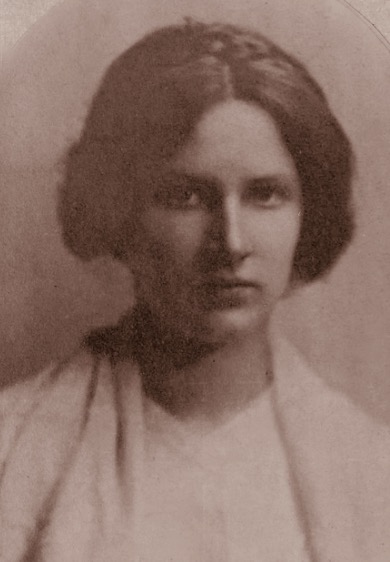
Elsie Whitaker Martinez

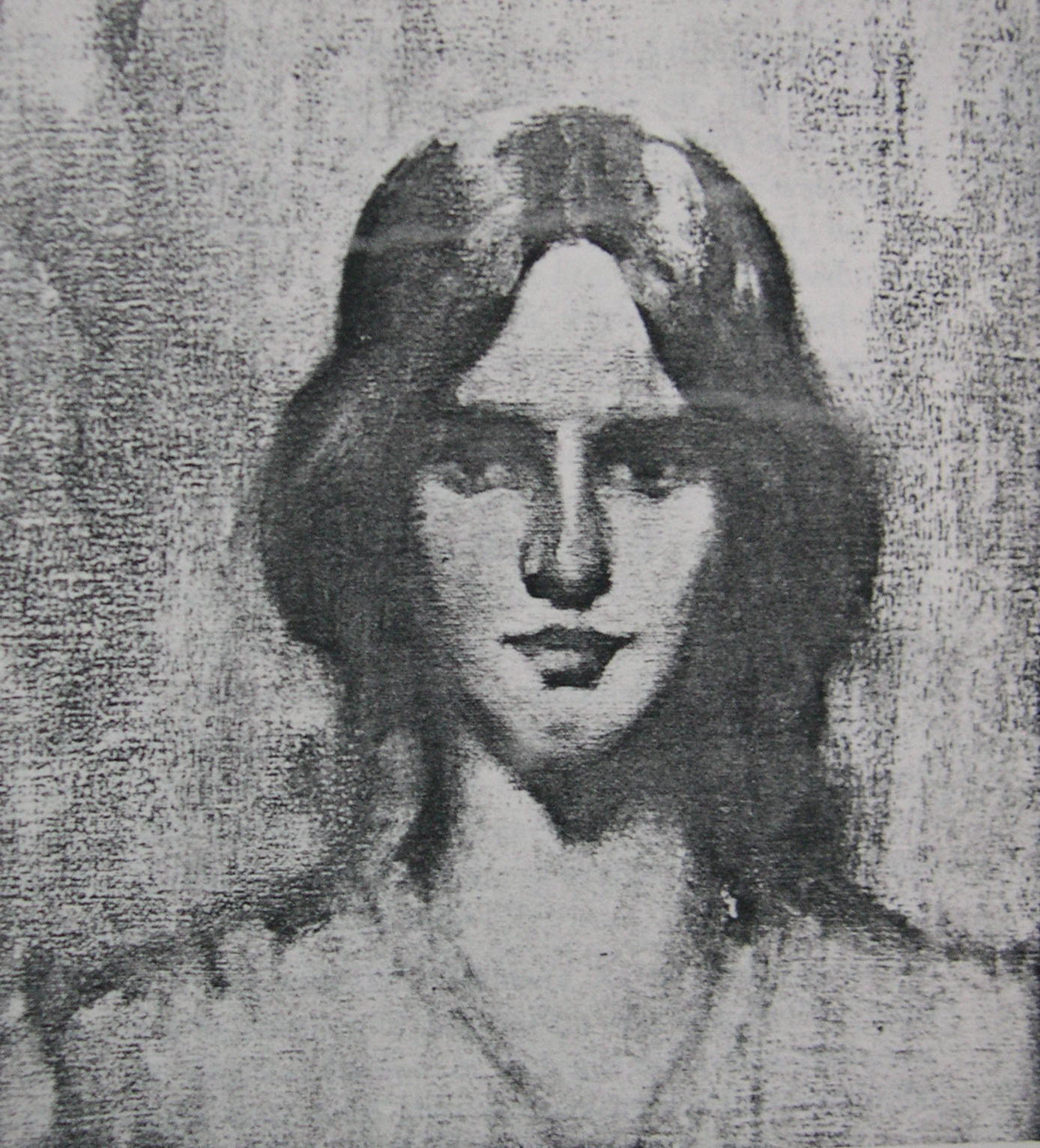
Painting of Elsie by Xavier Martínez

== See also ==
- History of Piedmont, California
