= 3 Bad Men =

1926 film directed by John Ford

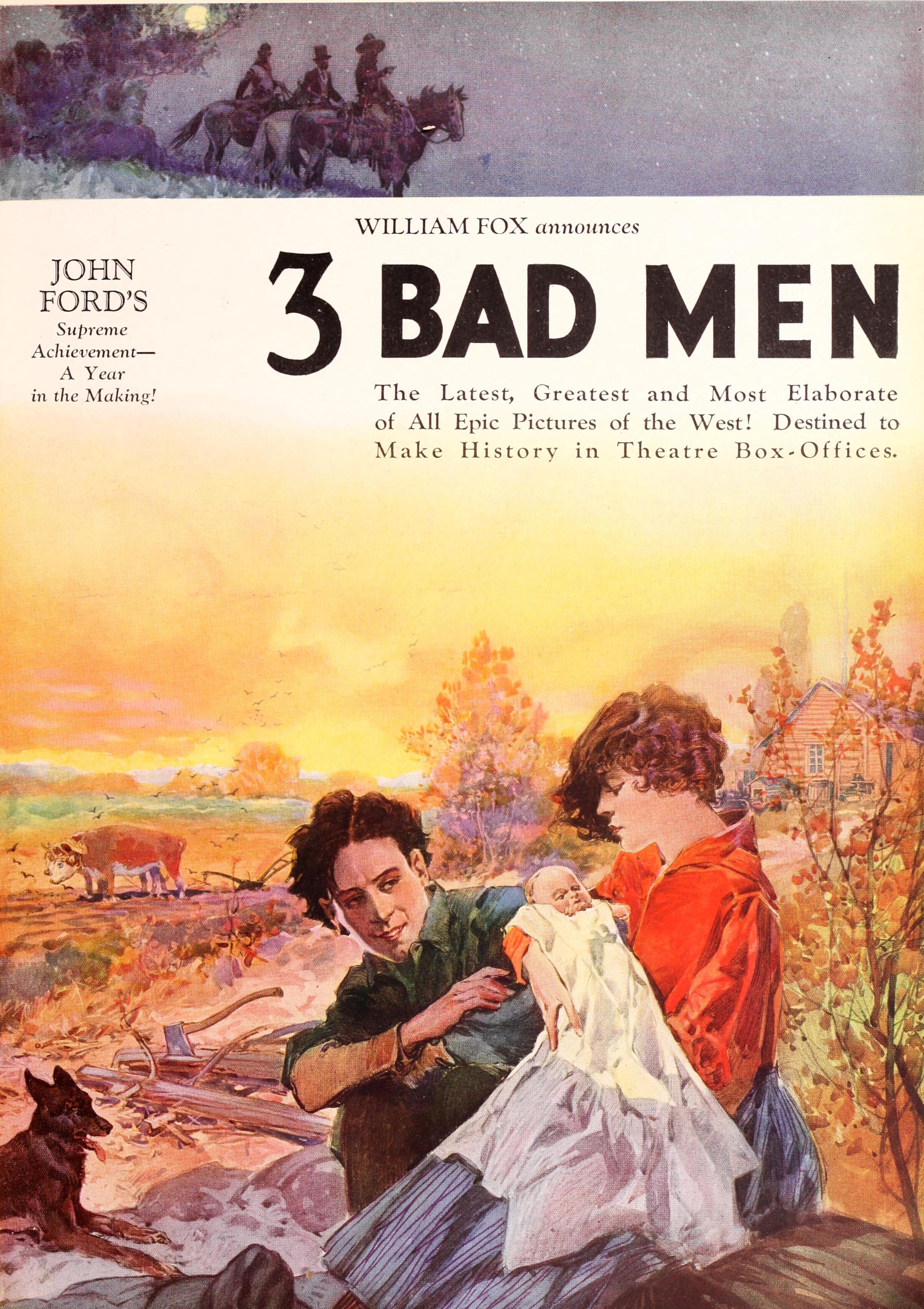
- Theatrical release poster
- Directed by: John Ford
- Written by: Herman Whitaker (novel Over the Border); John Stone; Malcolm Stuart Boylan; Ralph Spence
- Produced by: John Ford
- Starring: George O'Brien; Olive Borden
- Cinematography: George Schneiderman
- Distributed by: Fox Film Corporation
- Release date: August 28, 1926
- Running time: 92 minutes
- Country: United States
- Languages: Silent; English intertitles

3 Bad Men is a 1926 American silent Western film directed by John Ford. Bob Mastrangelo has called it "One of John Ford's greatest silent epics." The film possibly inspired the title for Akira Kurosawa's 1958 film Three Bad Men in a Hidden Fortress, simply known as The Hidden Fortress in the rest of the world.

== Plot ==
Full movie

A discovery of gold in the Dakotas on Sioux lands in 1877 provokes a gold land rush. Numerous people come to Custer for their chance to claim land and possibly gold when the proclamation to explore the lands goes into effect, such as singing cowboy Dan O'Malley, the Carletons, and a group of three outlaws headed by "Bull" Stanley. On their way to steal a bunch of horses, the outlaws save Lee Carleton from a different set of outlaws, who kill her father. Instead of taking the horses for themselves, the three outlaws decide to head to Custer as her protectors. The town is plagued with vice and injustice, headed by the corrupt Sheriff Layne Hunter, who learns where gold is located and wants to find it before the settlers. Unbeknownst to the outlaws, he has also seduced and abandoned Bull's sister, Millie. Meanwhile, the three "bad men", tired of their life of crime, decide to arrange a marriage for Lee, who soon meets up with Dan. The three outlaws must deal with that unexpected romantic attraction, along with the looming sheriff's gang and the race of the settlers' wagons for gold. Dan and Lee find love with each other while the three outlaws kill the sheriff, before dying in their doomed last stand. Dan and Lee are married, and have a son, named Stanley Costigan Allen O'Malley, in memory of the 3 Bad Men.

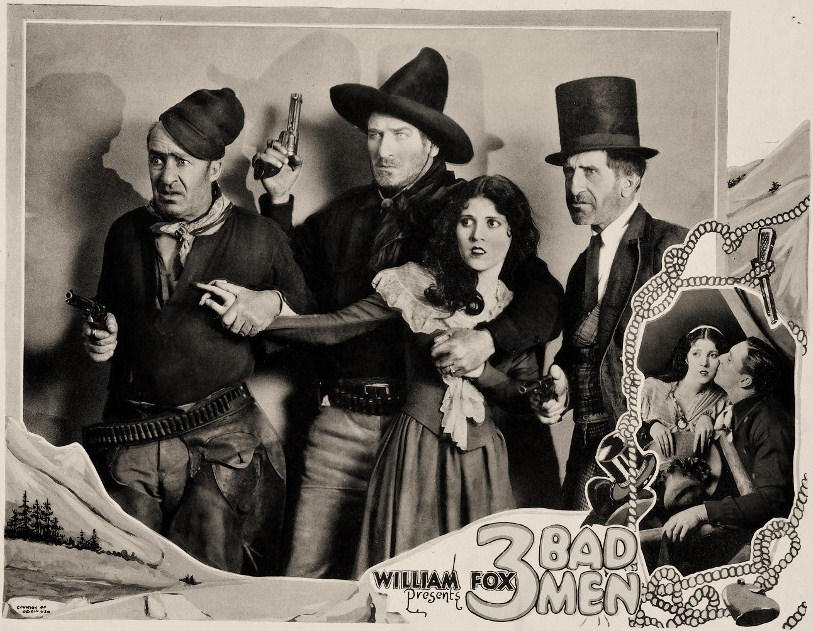
Lobby card

== Cast ==
- George O'Brien as Dan O'Malley
- Olive Borden as Lee Carleton
- Lou Tellegen as Sheriff Layne Hunter
- Tom Santschi as "Bull" Stanley
- J. Farrell MacDonald as Mike Costigan
- Frank Campeau as "Spade" Allen
- Priscilla Bonner as Millie Stanley
- Otis Harlan as Editor Zach Little
- Phyllis Haver as Lily (prairie beauty)
- Georgie Harris as Joe Minsk
- Alec B. Francis as Rev. Calvin Benson (as Alec Francis)
- Jay Hunt as Nat Lucas (old prospector)
- Grace Gordon as Millie's pal (uncredited)
- George Irving as Gen. Neville (uncredited)
- Bud Osborne as Hunter's henchman (uncredited)
- Vester Pegg as Henchman shooting Lucas (uncredited)

== Production ==
The film was shot over a fifteen-month period in 1925 and 1926. During the filming, three of the actresses involved, Olive Borden, Priscilla Bonner, and Grace Gordon, became ill with a form of paratyphoid fever, and had to be taken to the hospital.

The shooting locations for the film included:

- Desert outside of Victorville, California
- The vicinity of Jackson Hole, Wyoming

== Preservation ==
Complete prints of 3 Bad Men are held by the Library of Congress, the Cinematheque Royale de Belgique, the Cinemateket-Svenska Filminstitutet, the Museum of Modern Art, the BFI, the George Eastman Museum and the Deutsches Filminstitut.
