= Herman Whitaker =

Historic hotel in California, U.S.

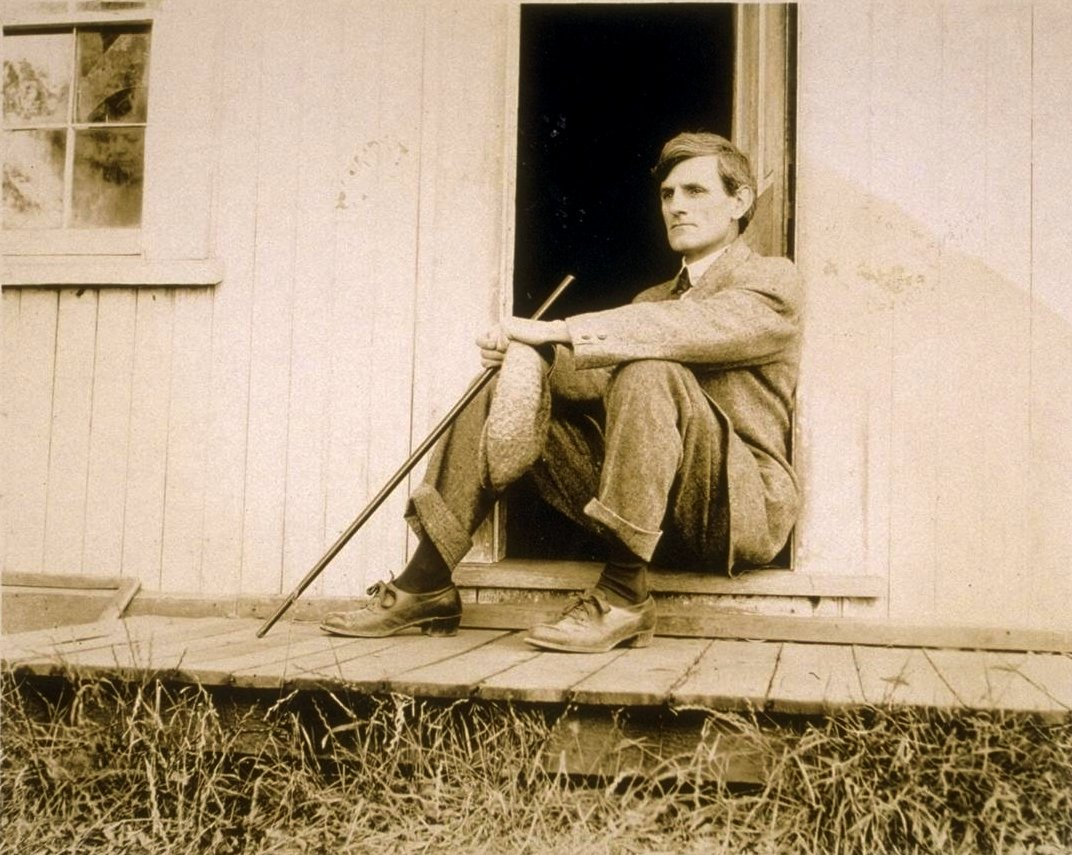
- Herman Whitaker
- Born: Herman James Whitaker; January 14, 1867; Huddersfield, England
- Died: January 20, 1919 (aged 52); New York City, New York, US
- Occupation: Writer
- Spouses: Margaret A Vandecar (m. 1888; died 1905) Alyse Lourdes Hunt (m. 1907)
- Children: 7

Herman James Whitaker (January 14, 1867 – January 20, 1919), known as Jim to his friends, was an English-born writer. Whitaker authored more than two hundred short stories and several books.

== Early life ==
Whitaker was born on January 14, 1867, in Huddersfield, England. His father was John Whitaker (1821-1883), a successful wool merchant, and his mother was Annie Walton (1834-1921). He had two years of college at Crossley's School at Halifax, West Yorkshire.

== Career ==
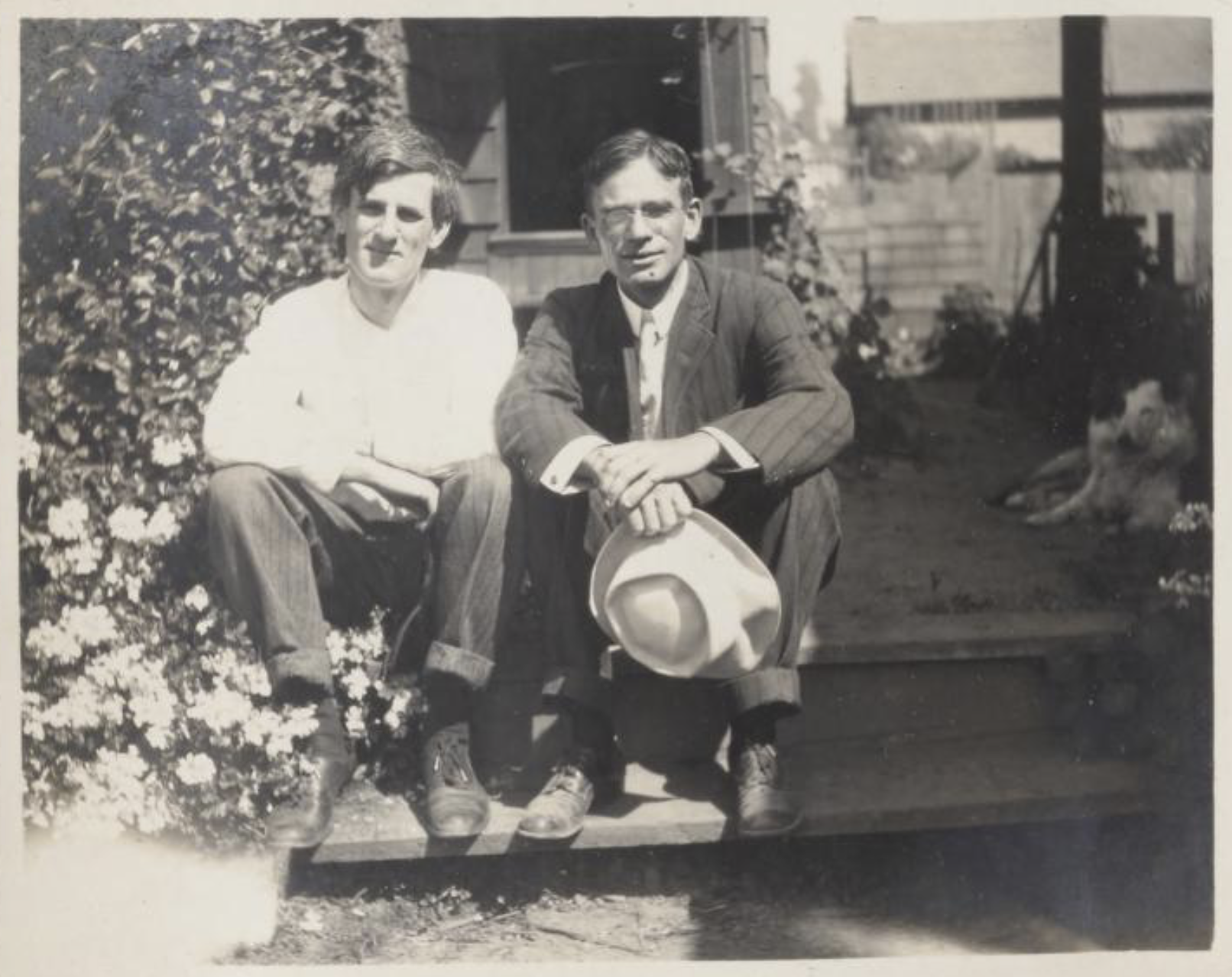
Herman Whitaker & John Wilson

At 16, Whitaker joined the British Army and served for 3 years with the 2nd Battalion West Riding Artillery. When he left the army in 1886, he immigrated to Canada and worked for the Hudson's Bay Company. He married Margaret A Vandecar (1868-1905) on March 21, 1888, in Oxford County, Ontario. They had seven children during their marriage. In the 1880s, Whitaker and his wife Margaret had a farm near Russell, Manitoba. In 1895, Whitaker moved to Oakland, California. His book,The Settler (1906), is a story about a man determined to build a railway to link to the Canadian Pacific Railway.

Whitaker moved to California during the Panic of 1893. To help support his family he dug ditches, built barns, and worked for $12 (equivalent to $464 in 2025) a-week as a grocery store clerk in Oakland. At 35 years old, he started his writing career by submitting stories to the Overland Monthly and Harper's Magazine. These early stories made, at first, only $2.50 (equivalent to $97 in 2025) per story. They helped gain his acceptance into the Bay Area artist colony. He became friends with the Bohemian group including writers Joaquin Miller, Jack London, Austin Lewis, Bess London, George Sterling and Carrie Sterling. During this period, he became an activist for socialism.

In 1902, Whitaker and his family moved to Piedmont, California to the "Silk Culture House" at the end of Mountain Avenue. Harper's sent him to Mexico to investigate the "rubber scandal". Whitaker's wife, Margaret died in September 1905.

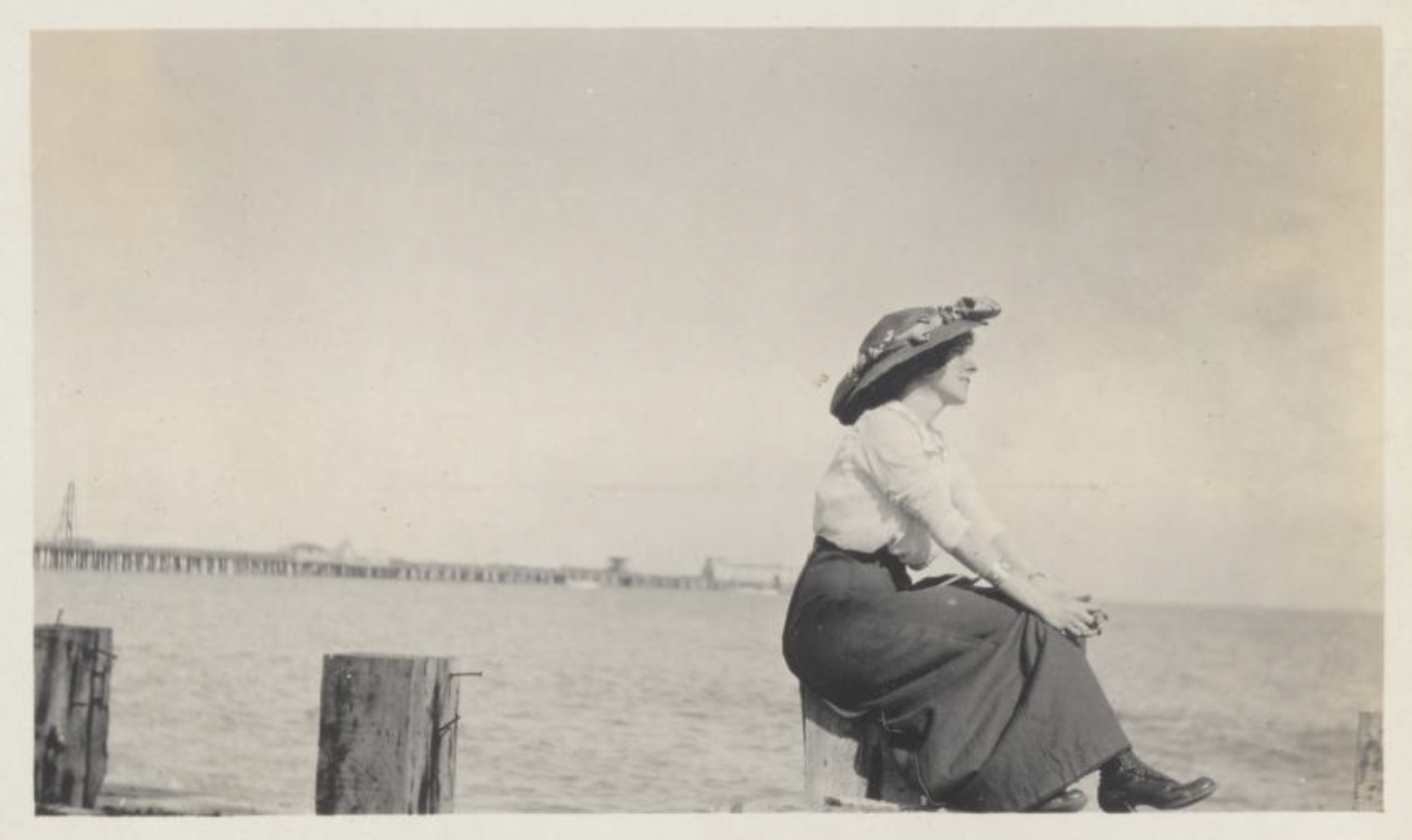
Elsie Whitaker

After the 1906 San Francisco earthquake Whitaker used his house in Piedmont to help many of his friends. His daughter, Elsie Whitaker, known for her beauty, was the subject of several photographs and paintings. She married Mexican-American artist Xavier Timoteo Martinez (1869–1943) in San Francisco on October 17, 1907, at age 16. They were later separated but stayed friends until Martinez's death in 1943. George Sterling called her, "the Blessed Damozel." During this time Whitaker visited his daughter in Carmel-by-the-Sea, California where he met writer John Fleming Wilson.

Whitaker met musician, F. L. "Reggie" Bassett and his wife Alyce Hunt Bassett. He became interested in Alyce after her divorce from Bassett. On August 11, 1907, they married in San Francisco. He became a United States citizen on December 10, 1913.

Whitaker was friends with General John J. Pershing during his Pancho Villa Expedition into Mexico that followed Pancho Villa's raid on Columbus, New Mexico. Whitaker was an authority on Mexico. He worked as a correspondent for the Oakland Tribune and got the opportunity to meet and be photographed with Pancho Villa. In 1909, his discoveries in Tehuantepec, Mexico provided the background for the novel The Planter. It was made into a movie in 1917 and distributed by the Mutual Film Company. Stage and screen actor Tyrone Power Sr. played the hero.

During World War I Whitaker became the Tribune's war correspondent with the American Expeditionary Forces in France. At the age of 50, he was with the troops on the front lines and felt the effects of mustard gas while going "over the top" during trench warfare. He flew in sea planes, was onboard destroyers, and on minesweepers as they cleared the sea lanes. His book, Hunting the German Shark, is based on what he observed of the Allied submarine warfare in the Atlantic. While he was aboard the destroyer USS Cummings, he met his son Percy Whitaker by surprise, who was a Gunner's mate on the Cummings.

== Death ==
In Paris, Whitaker became ill so returned home to the US. He died on January 20, 1919, of stomach cancer, at St. Luke's Hospital, Manhattan at the age of 52. It was one week after having had surgery at St. Luke's Hospital. He was survived by his wife, two daughters, and five sons. His ashes were scattered on Round Top, an extinct volcano in the Berkeley Hills, near Oakland.

== Works ==
- "The Probationer" (1905)
- The Settler (1906)
- The Planter (1909)
- "The Mystery of the Barranca" (1913)
- "Cross Trails: The Story of One Woman in the North Woods" (1914)
- Over the Border: A Novel of Northern Mexico (1916)
- "Hunting the German Shark" (1919)

== Filmography ==
- The Planter , 1917, lost film
- 3 Bad Men, 1926, a silent adaptation of Over the Border
- Not Exactly Gentlemen, 1931 sound adaptation of Over the Border

== Legacy ==
Whitaker authored 200 short stories for periodicals and several books. Many of Whitaker's stories dealt with social injustice and were set in Canada and Mexico. His novel Over the Border (1916) was adapted for the John Ford western 3 Bad Men in 1926.
