= Frank C. Havens =

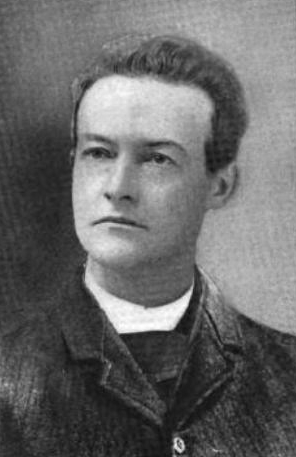
- Born: Frank Colton Havens; November 21, 1848; Sag Harbor, New York
- Died: February 9, 1918 (aged 69); Piedmont, California
- Occupation: Developer

Frank Colton Havens (November 21, 1848 – February 9, 1918) was a real estate and water developer in the San Francisco Bay Area.

== Biography ==
Havens was born into one of the founding families of Shelter Island, New York, the son of Wickham Sayre Havens and Sarah Darling Havens of Sag Harbor. After a year in the China shipping trade as a young man, he came to California in 1866. He worked for the Savings and Loan Society in San Francisco, then founded a stock brokerage firm in partnership with Van Dyke Hubbard in about 1880. He subsequently organized several insurance and investment firms before founding the Oakland-based Realty Syndicate in 1895 with F. M. ("Borax") Smith.

He was a lawyer in the San Francisco Bay Area from the late 19th to early 20th centuries who also was a major developer of real estate in the East Bay, particularly in the cities of Oakland, Berkeley and Piedmont. He built the four-story Havens Mansion in Piedmont on Wildwood Gardens, designed by architect Bernard Maybeck with interior by Louis Comfort Tiffany. Havens was a follower of Eastern philosophy and meditation and the mansion had an opium smoking bed in it and an inscription related to such philosophy.

Throughout his life, Havens maintained a summer home in Sag Harbor.

== Associates ==
Havens was closely associated with Francis "Borax" Smith through their "Realty Syndicate" which, among other things, built the Claremont Hotel and was originally the parent company of the Key System transit company. The Western Railway Museum includes operating street cars and transbay trains that operated on Havens' Key System lines.

His sons, Harold C. Havens and Wickham Havens followed their father into real estate development in the East Bay area.

Havens was an enthusiast for planting eucalyptus trees in the Bay Area. Between 1910 and 1914, his Mahogany Eucalyptus and Land Company had planted nearly three million Tasmanian blue gum eucalyptus and Monterey pine seedlings on 3,000 acres in the East Bay. The scheme was supposed to make Havens a fortune, but although eucalyptus grew quickly it made poor lumber. Havens soon shutdown the sawmills and nurseries, but the eucalyptus and pine groves remain. Native animals (particularly the migratory monarch butterfly) have learned to live in the eucalyptus. Unfortunately, both the eucalyptus and Monterey pine trees are a major fire hazard, and both played a major part in the destructive 1991 firestorm that devastated much of the Oakland/Berkeley hills.

One of his nephews was George Sterling, a noted local poet.

== Death ==
He died February 9, 1918, at his home in Piedmont. His ashes are interred at the Chapel of the Chimes adjacent to the Mountain View Cemetery in Oakland. His mansion had an unfinished and unused tomb room.

== Honors ==
A boulevard in Oakland is named for one of his namesake developments, Havenscourt. The Frank C. Havens Elementary School in Piedmont is also named for him.

== See also ==
- History of Piedmont, California
- Claremont Canyon Conservancy
