= Xavier Martínez =

American painter

Xavier Martinez
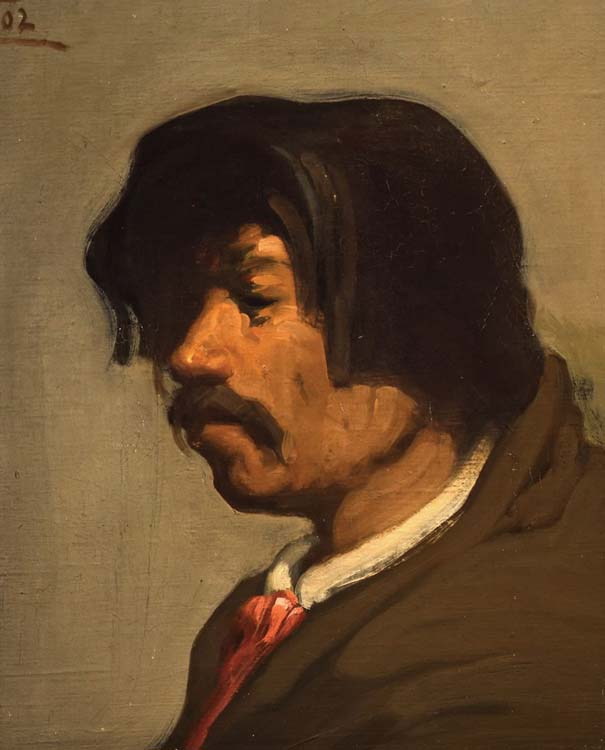
- Self-Portrait, 1902
- Born: Javier Timoteo Martínez y Orozco; February 7, 1869; Guadalajara, Jalisco, Mexico
- Died: January 13, 1943 (aged 73); Carmel-by-the-Sea, California
- Other names: Xavier Tizoc Martinez, Marty Martinez
- Education: California School of Design, École des Beaux Arts, Académie Eugène Carrière
- Known for: Fine art painting
- Movement: California Tonalism
- Spouse: Elsie Whitaker Martinez
- Children: Micaela Martinez DuCasse
- Patrons: Rosalia LaBastida de Coney, Alexander K. Coney

Xavier Timoteo Martínez (February 7, 1869 – January 13, 1943) was a Mexican-born American artist active in California the late 19th and early 20th century. He was a well-known bohemian figure in San Francisco, the East Bay, and the Monterey Peninsula and one of the co-founders of two California artists' organizations and an art gallery. He painted in a tonalist style and also produced monotypes, etchings, and silverpoint.

== Childhood in Guadalajara ==
He was originally christened Javier Timoteo Martínez y Orozco, but later called himself Xavier Tizoc Martinez, the middle name acknowledging his Purépecha heritage. He was known to his friends as "Marty." Martinez was born in Guadalajara in 1869 to a Mexican father and a Spanish mother. Martinez began drawing his classmates and teachers at a young age while attending public school. After school he worked in his father's bookstore bookbinding and helping with printing chores. He learned French and wrote poetry, admiring the poems of Goethe, Schiller and various French poets. In his later autobiographical writings he recalled how at age ten his mother would teach him about the movements of celestial bodies.

== Early life ==
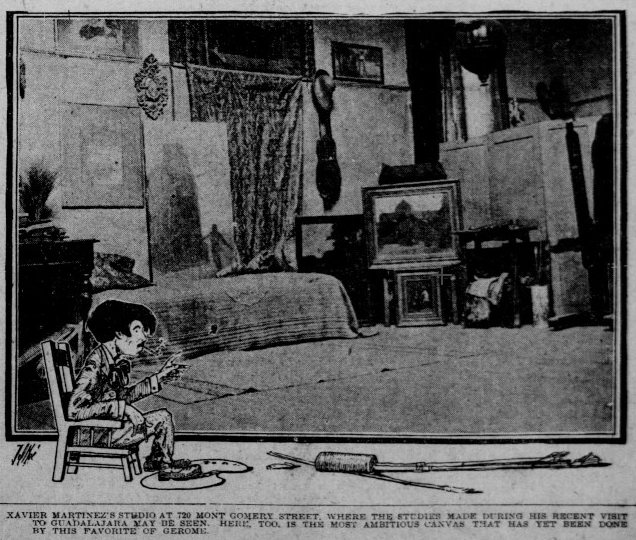
Photo of Martinez's studio with a caricature of the artist, San Francisco Call, 30 July 1905

Martinez reflected that at this age he had his first awareness that there was a rhythm in the order of things. At age 13 he began attending the Liceo de Varones (Grammar School for Men), where he studied pre-Columbian archaeology and his TaPurépechaascan heritage. He excelled in Indian designs and arts, and painted an oil copy of Entombment by Titian.

When his biological mother died at age 17, he was fostered and taken in by an aristocratic woman named Rosalia LaBastida de Coney (1844–1897); she was married to an American, Alexander K. Coney (1847–1930) who worked for Mexico's foreign office. When Alexander Coney was appointed Consul-General of Mexico and posted to in San Francisco in 1886, Martinez followed them, sailing through the Golden Gate in 1893.

Upon arrival in San Francisco, in 1893 Martinez enrolled in the California School of Design, also known as the Mark Hopkins Institute of Art or San Francisco Art Institute (SFAI). In 1895 he received the school's Avery Golden Medal in painting and an honorable mention in drawing. He graduated in 1897, worked briefly as assistant to the head of the institute, Arthur Frank Mathews, and became a member of the Bohemian Club.

Martinez entered the Paris École des Beaux Arts, Atelier Gérome in 1897. In 1898 he sent a number of paintings of Paris scenes back to the Bohemian Club for an exhibition in San Francisco. He enjoyed the company of Henri Matisse and graduated from the École in 1899. In 1900 he entered the Academy of Eugène Carrière and his Portrait of Miss Marion Holden – a Tonalist work similar to Whistler's Mother – won an honorable mention in the Mexican display at the Paris International Exposition.

== Return to San Francisco, Mexico trips ==
In 1901 he moved back to San Francisco. He shared an art studio with Gottardo Piazzoni and that year became a naturalized citizen of the United States. He advertised as a portrait painter, but also continued to paint tonalist landscapes. In the subsequent year he helped found the California Society of Artists with Piazzoni, Maynard Dixon, Charles Peter Neilson and other artists who were disaffected with the San Francisco Art Association. Their first and only exhibition included seventeen works by Martinez, mostly French scenes. In 1904 he began sharing his Montgomery Street atelier with Maynard Dixon; they held joint studio shows on Saturdays. The two travelled to Arizona and Tepic, Mexico, in April 1905; upon their return Martinez held several exhibitions.

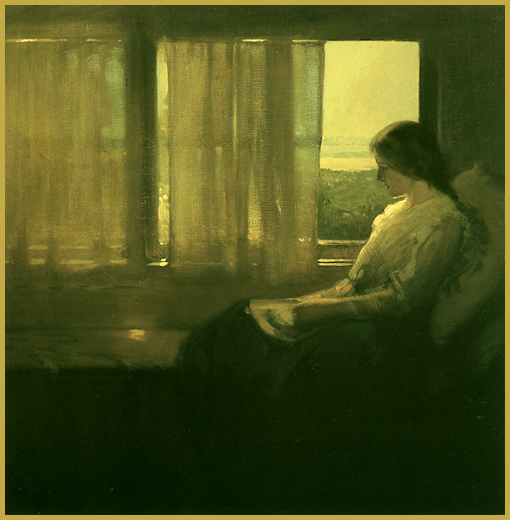
Afternoon in Piedmont (Elsie Whitaker Martinez), ca. 1908

In 1905 he spent two months in Guadalajara with Maynard Dixon. Upon his return to San Francisco he held a number of exhibitions, and also gave one show in New York, emphasizing the recent Mexican genre paintings. That year he produced a painting a critic called a "masterpiece," given the title The Prayer of the Earth by his poet friend George Sterling.

== Personal life ==
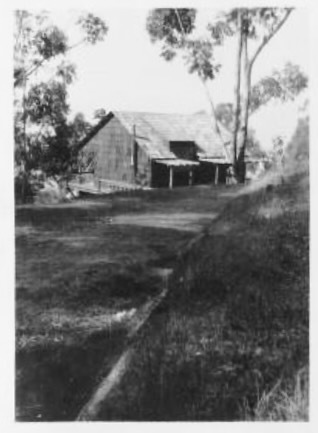
Marty's Studio, Piedmont

After the earthquake of 1906 he moved across the bay to Piedmont, California, and met Elsie Whitaker, 20 years his junior, the daughter of the writer Herman Whitaker. On October 17, 1907, he married Elsie Whitaker in Oakland. After their honeymoon in Carmel-by-the-Sea they commenced building a studio in Piedmont. During the summers of 1909 to 1914, they rented a house in Carmel so that Martínez could teach art classes at the Hotel Del Monte.

The Martínezes had a daughter on August 13, 1913: Micaela Martinez. She became a fine artist, studying painting with Victor Arnautoff and sculpture with Ralph Stackpole; she later studied stone cutting with Ruth Cravath. In 1944 she married artist Ralph DuCasse and changed her name to Micaela Martinez DuCasse. In 1923, Elsie and Xavier Martínez separated.

== Art and teaching career ==
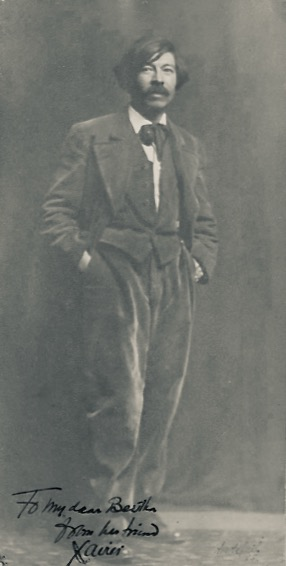
Xavier Martinez (1869-1943)

Martinez was one of a group of artists invited to create an art gallery at Monterey's Hotel Del Monte in 1907. He began teaching as a substitute drawing teacher in June 1909 at the California School of Arts and Crafts (CSAC) in Berkeley. By August he was appointed a permanent member of the faculty with the title "Instructor for Still Life and Landscape Painting in Oil." He published several articles on art history in the CSAC Alumni Magazine. He exhibited with members of the Berkeley art colony between 1906 and 1911. He taught at the California School of Fine Arts in San Francisco from 1916 to 1917, but his contract was not renewed because the conservative director of that school, Pedro Joseph de Lemos, objected to Martinez's "flamboyant attire and socialist-inspired commentaries." Martinez continued to teach at the CSAC and moved in 1924 to its new Oakland campus where three years later he was appointed a "Professor of Painting." He officially retired in September 1942. The School was renamed the California College of the Arts (CCA) in 2003. He taught summer classes in the Monterey area from 1910 to 1914. From 1915 through the late 1920s he instructed his summer classes from his Piedmont studio-home. In 1912 he helped found the California Society of Etchers; then, the following year he was elected to the National Geographic Society and given a key to the Capitol Club in Monterey. Also in 1913 he made a painting trip to the Arizona desert with Francis McComas (painter), which abruptly ended with much animosity and negative publicity in the press.

In 1914, Impressionists Childe Hassam and Edward Simmons came to Piedmont to view Martinez' desert paintings. The following year he exhibited at the Panama Pacific International Exhibition (where he won honorable mention) and at the Golden Gate Park Museum in San Francisco. Throughout this period he had shows in New York, Philadelphia and San Francisco. Noted paintings of this period are Head of a Girl, The Storm, Piedmont Hills and Lake Merritt. Between 1916 and 1920 he had numerous exhibitions including at the Palace of Fine Arts, The San Francisco Art Association and the Hotel Oakland. Martinez became a member of the American Federation of Arts in 1921. In subsequent years he continued to exhibit, but was increasingly called upon to be a juror of other artists' works. In 1935 he showed The Green Moon at the San Francisco Museum of Art.

In 1939 he exhibited Portrait of Elsie at the 1939–1940 Golden Gate International Exposition (GGIE), on Treasure Island. Martinez was selected in 1940 to represent California in the Hall of Fame at the World's Fair of 1940 in New York as one of three (along with Father Junipero Serra and William Keith).

== Writings ==
Under the influence of his friend the poet George Sterling, Martinez wrote poetry. His poem "Mictlan" was selected for publication in the Book Club of California's prestigious 1925 anthology Continent's End: An Anthology of Contemporary California Poets.

During the last two decades of his life, Martinez became increasingly interested in his indigenous Mexican heritage. He published poetry and philosophic writings in a column entitled "Notas de un Chichimeca" in the Hispano-Americano, San Francisco's Spanish-language newspaper.

== Death ==
In 1941, Martinez became ill. Elsie brought him to Carmel to be with her, their daughter, and Harriet Dean. He was with Elsie for seven months before he died on January 13, 1943.

== Permanent collections ==
Xavier Martinez' paintings are held in the following museums:

- Crocker Art Museum, Sacramento, California
- Fine Arts Museums of San Francisco
- Guadalajara Art Museum
- Mills College Art Museum
- Oakland Museum of California

== See also ==
- California Tonalism
