= Sidney Dearing =

American businessperson (1870–1953)

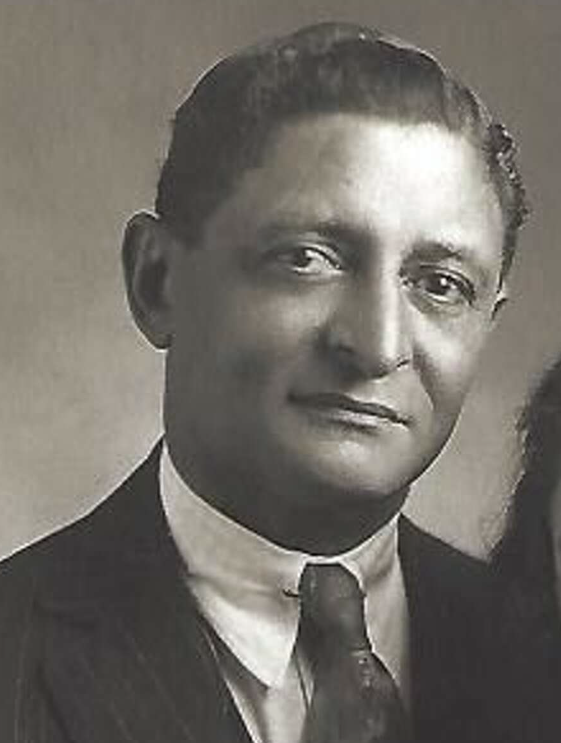
- Born: Sidney Algenon Dearing; March 8, 1870; Fredericksburg, Texas, U.S.
- Died: October 6, 1953 (aged 83); Alameda County, California, U.S.
- Resting place: Alhambra Cemetery, Martinez, California, U.S.
- Other names: Sidney Allen Dearing; Sid Dearing
- Occupation: Businessperson
- Spouse: Lizzie Williams (m. 1899) Irene Davis (m. 1920–1925)
- Children: 2

Sidney Allen "Sid" Dearing (March 8, 1870 – October 6, 1953) was an American businessperson. He owned the Creole Cafe in Oakland, California. Dearing was Black Seminole, and in the 1920s he and his family were the subject of racial discrimination and hate crimes in Piedmont, California.

== Early life ==
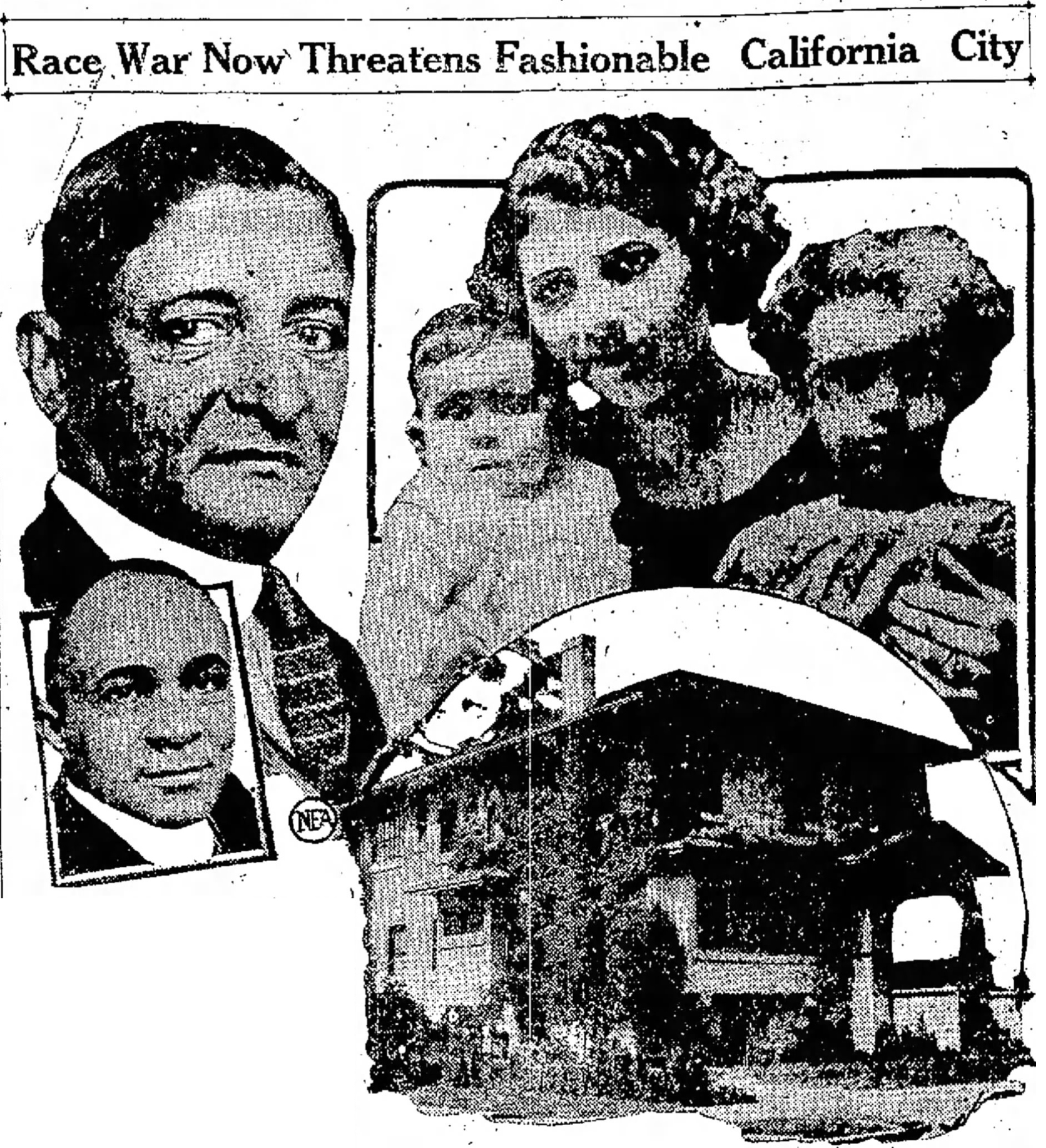
Image from The Ogden Standard-Examiner (May 1924), featuring the Dearing family, their house, and their lawyer on the far left

Sidney Dearing was born on March 8, 1870, in Fredericksburg, Texas. He was Black and Seminole.

He moved to California in 1907. His first marriage to Lizzie Williams ended with her death. His second marriage was to Irene Davis in 1920.

== Career ==
He owned the Creole Cafe founded in 1921 on 7th Street in the West Oakland neighborhood of Oakland, California, it was a popular jazz club and Southern restaurant. The Creole Cafe was shut down during the Prohibition-era.

In January 1924, Dearing purchased a two-story house at 67 Wildwood Avenue in Piedmont, California for US$10,000 (approximately $187864 with inflation). The house was purchased by his white mother-in-law Julia Davis. She then signed over the property to her daughter and son-in-law. They were the first Black homeowners in the city. By May 1924, a crowd of some 500 people gathered outside the Dearing house, threatening violence if the family didn't move. Over the next few months an unexploded bomb was found in their garden, as well as gunshots that struck the home and cars parked outside, and bricks were thrown through windows. Dearing's lawyer was John D. Drake, also the president of the local NAACP.

The city of Piedmont and Mayor Oliver Ellsworth (1867–1939) offered the Dearings USD $8,000 for the house with a threat of condemnation proceedings, and Dearings refused the money. Eventually after many legal hearings the family was forced to sell the home in May 1924, for US$10,500. Their former 67 Wildwood Avenue property is estimated worth over $2 million, as of 2026.

In March 1925, Dearing sued his wife Irene for the property money. Daring and Irene Davis divorced in May 1925. After the divorce, Irene and the two children moved to New York.

Dearing was arrested in 1946 for running an illegal dominos gambling ring in Oakland, California.

== Death and legacy ==
Dearing died on October 6, 1953, in Alameda County, California, and he was buried in Alhambra Cemetery in Martinez, California.

The Sidney and Irene Dearing Memorial Project was started in 2022, and is led by artist and landscape designer Walter J. Hood with a planned installation in Dearing Park in Piedmont. As of 2026, the Sidney and Irene Dearing Memorial Project is not completed.

In 2026, the descendant of the Dearings filed a lawsuit claiming racial discrimination and fraudulent condemnation of property against the city of Piedmont. They also claim the police did not intervene to stop the violence.

== See also ==
- African Americans in the East Bay (San Francisco Bay Area)
- Burton Becker
- History of Piedmont, California
