= Burton Becker =

American police officer

Burton F. Becker was an American police officer. He was the police chief of Piedmont, California in the early 20th century, and Kailiff of Ku Klux Klan No. 9 in Oakland, California. He was elected Sheriff of Alameda County in 1926. As sheriff, Becker offered protection to illegal gambling operators and bootleggers in exchange for bribes. In 1930, after years of investigation by Alameda County District Attorney Earl Warren, he was tried and convicted on corruption charges, removed from office and sent to San Quentin Prison to serve a sentence of one to 14 years. He was paroled in February 1934 and pardoned by California Governor Frank Merriam in 1936.

== See also ==
- Sidney Dearing
