= Timeline of The Hague =

The following is a timeline of the history of the municipality of The Hague, Netherlands,

== Prior to 19th century ==
- ca.1230 - Hunting lodge established by Floris IV, Count of Holland.
- ca.1280 - Chapel built in the Binnenhof (approximate date).
- ca.1290 - Completion of the Ridderzaal building in the Binnenhof by Floris V, Count of Holland.
- ca.1380 - Civic Guard of The Hague established, the Saint George Archers Guild.
- 1397 - Cloister Church erected.
- 15th C. - Sint-Jacobskerk (church) building expanded.
- 1446 - Staten-Generaal (parliament) begins meeting in the Binnenhof.
- 1456 - Order of the Golden Fleece meets in The Hague for their 9th chapter.
- 1467 - Charles the Bold inaugurated in The Hague as Count of Holland.
- 1479 - Wolfert VI of Borselen and Reyner of Broeckhuysen conquer and plunder The Hague.
- 1489 - Francis of Brederode conquers The Hague and puts it to ransom.
- 1494 - Saint Laurence chamber of rhetoric active.
- 1516 - Printing press in operation.
- 1527 - The Hague becomes "the seat of the supreme court in Holland."
- 1528 - Maarten van Rossum, field marshal of Charles, Duke of Guelders, sacks The Hague.
- 1565 - Town Hall built.
- 1573 - During the Siege of Leiden the Spanish general Francisco de Valdez has his headquarters in The Hague.
- 1584 - The Hague becomes "the place of assembly of the States of Holland and of the States-general."
- 1595 - Noordeinde Palace purchased.
- 1603 - Treaty of The Hague, between Enno III, Count of East Frisia and the rebellious city of Emden.
- 1619 - Execution of statesman Johan van Oldenbarnevelt.
- 1644 - Mauritshuis (residence) built.
- 1646 - Huis ten Bosch (palace) built.
- 1651 - Great Assembly (Netherlands) held.
- 1653 - Scheveningseweg (Scheveningen-The Hague) road built.
- 1656
  - Nieuwe Kerk (church) built.
  - Confrerie Pictura (artists' group) formed.
- 1658 - Huygens invents the pendulum clock.
- 1659 - Concert of The Hague (1659)
- 1672 - 20 August: Lynching of Cornelis and Johan de Witt.
- 1681 - Boterwaag (weigh house for butter) built.
- 1701 - Treaty of The Hague, between England, the Holy Roman Empire, and the United Provinces, creating an alliance against France.
- 1708 - 'Gravenhaagsche Courant newspaper in publication.
- 1720 - Treaty of The Hague, ending the War of the Quadruple Alliance.
- 1726 - Honen Dal Synagogue built.
- 1747 - William IV, Prince of Orange moves to The Hague.
- 1750 - Scheurleer's circulating library in business.
- 1764 - Lange Voorhout Palace built.
- 1772 - Kunstliefde Spaart geen Vlijt literary society formed.
- 1774 - Prince William V Gallery established, the first public museum of the Netherlands
- 1793 - Diligentia (society) founded.
- 1795
  - 31 January: Declaration of the Rights of Man and of the Citizen, in The Hague, by the revolutionary Patriots, similar to the French declaration of 1789.
  - 16 May: French-Batavian treaty signed in The Hague.
- 1798 - Royal Library of the Netherlands established.

== 19th century ==
- 1804 - Scheurleer & Zoonen in business.
- 1806 - Granted city rights by Louis Bonaparte
- 1814 - Staatscourant newspaper begins publication.
- 1816 - Royal Cabinet of Rarities founded by King William I of the Netherlands.
- 1822 - Mauritshuis re-established.
- 1823 - Metal Factory of Enthoven opens.
- 1824 - Lodewijk Constantijn Rabo Copes van Cattenburch becomes mayor.
- 1838
  - Supreme Court of the Netherlands headquartered in The Hague.
  - Gymnasium Haganum (school) active.
- 1844 - Synagogue, The Hague built on Wagenstraat.
- 1845 - William of Orange monument erected on Noordeinde, The Hague.
- 1852 - Museum Meermanno-Westreenianum established.
- 1853 - Martinus Nijhoff Publishers in business.
- 1855 - Pander & Son founded, an aircraft and furniture factory.
- 1863 - Haagse Dierentuin (zoo) established.
- 1866 - Kunstmuseum Den Haag established.
- 1869 - Monument erected in the Plein 1813.
- 1870s - Artistic "Hague School" style of painting active.
- 1870
  - Gouda–Den Haag railway begins operating.
  - Station Den Haag Staatsspoor (train station) opens.
- 1872 - Hague Congress of the International Workingmen's Association.
- 1878 - James the Greater Church (The Hague) built on Parkstraat.
- 1881 - 1 August: Panorama Mesdag opens.
- 1882 - The Prisongate Museum opens.
- 1883 - Rozenburg Earthenware factory established.
- 1884 - Hague Municipal Archive established.
- 1885
  - Hague Passage shopping arcade opens.
  - Grand Hotel Central in business.
- 1887 - Museum Mesdag opens.
- 1890 - Royal (restaurant) in business.
- 1893 - Hague Conference on Private International Law
- 1898 - Nationale Tentoonstelling van Vrouwenarbeid 1898
- 1899
  - International peace conference held in The Hague.
  - Permanent Court of Arbitration established.
- 1900 - Population: 212,211.

== 20th century ==
- 1903 - Haagsche Commissie Bank established.
- 1904
  - Residentie Orchestra formed.
  - Museum for Education founded, since renamed to Museon.
- 1905 - ADO Den Haag football club formed.
- 1907
  - International peace conference held in The Hague.
  - Anglo-Dutch Royal Dutch Shell company and its Bataafse Petroleum Maatschappij headquartered in city.
- 1913 - Peace Palace built.
- 1914 - Belgian World War I refugees arrive in The Hague. Thousands would follow.
- 1917
  - Hundreds of British soldiers arrive in The Hague, to recover from the stress of their detainment in camps.
  - The House of Lords (restaurant) in business.
- 1918 - Townley Hall built in The Hague, barracks for 1,200 detained British soldiers and officers. Named after Sir Walter Beaupré Townley, a British diplomat.
- 1919 - Population: 359,610.
- 1921 - Asta cinema opens.
- 1922
  - 15 June: Museum Bredius founded.
  - 22 July: International Permanent Court of Arbitration begins operating from its headquarters in The Hague.
- 1923 - The Hague Academy of International Law established.
- 1925 - Zuiderpark Stadion (stadium) opens.
- 1929 - Netherlands Postal Museum opens, since renamed to COMM
- 1935 - Gemeentemuseum Den Haag (museum for modern art) opens.
- 1940 - 10 May: Battle for The Hague.
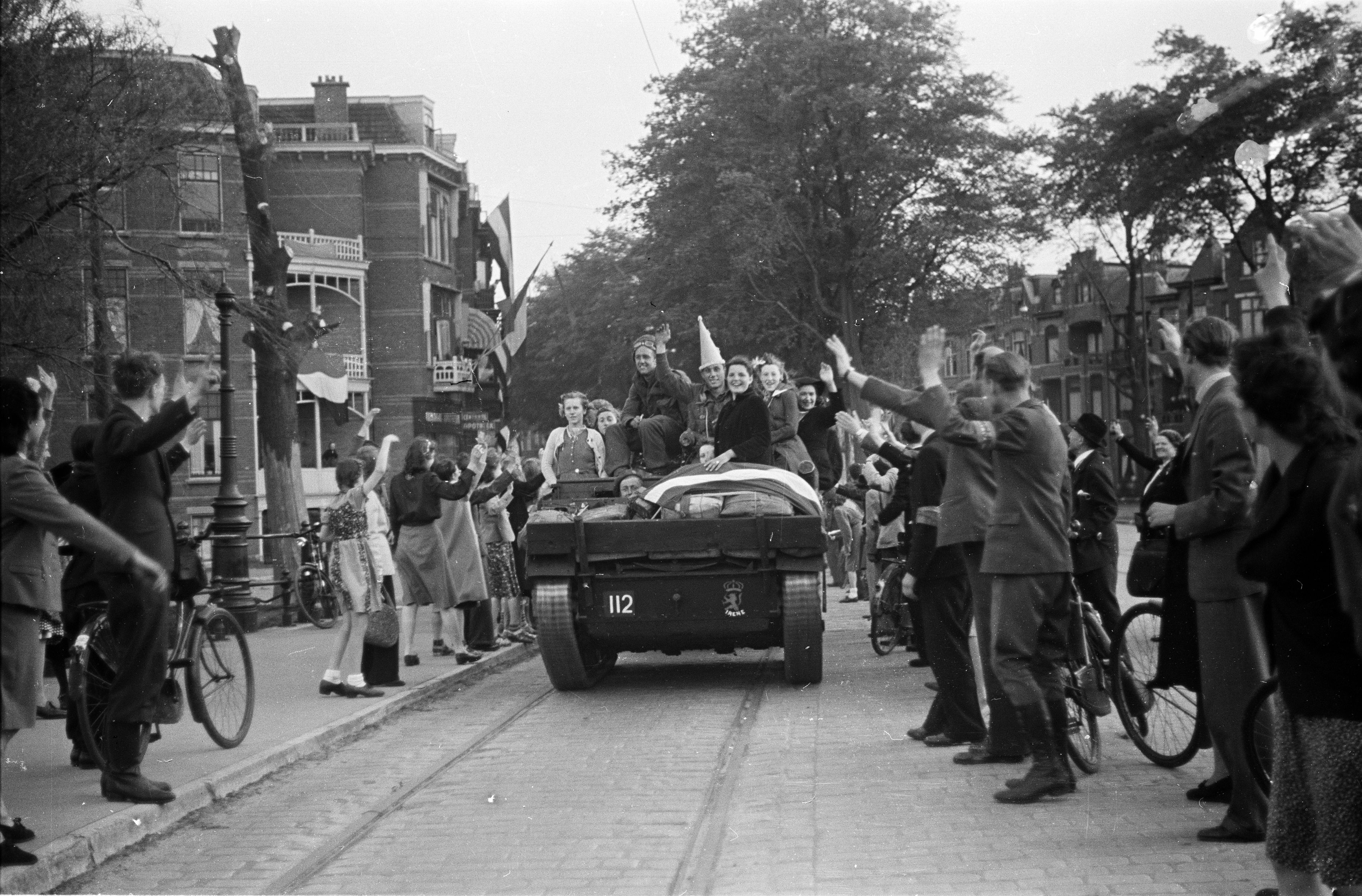
  People celebrating the liberation of the Netherlands at the end of World War II on 8 May 1945
- 1945 - 3 March: Bombing of the Bezuidenhout.
- 1946 - United Nations International Court of Justice headquartered in The Hague.
- 1947 - Haagse Comedie established.
- 1948 - Congress of Europe in The Hague.
- 1950 - White Bridge (The Hague) rebuilt.
- 1952 - International Institute of Social Studies established.
- 1954 - Nederlands Letterkundig Museum founded.
- 1955 - Mobarak Mosque built.
- 1959 - Nederlands Dans Theater founded.
- 1966 - July: Death of Hsu Tsu-tsai.
- 1969 - World Forum Convention Center opens.
- 1971 - International Federation of Library Associations headquartered in city.
- 1973 - Den Haag Centraal railway station built.
- 1974 - 13 September: 1974 French Embassy attack in The Hague.
- 1976 - Eurovision Song Contest 1976 held in The Hague.
- 1979 - Assassination of Richard Sykes (British diplomat).
- 1980
  - Population: 456,886 municipality.
  - Eurovision Song Contest 1980 held in The Hague.
- 1981 - Filmhouse The Hague (arthouse) opens.
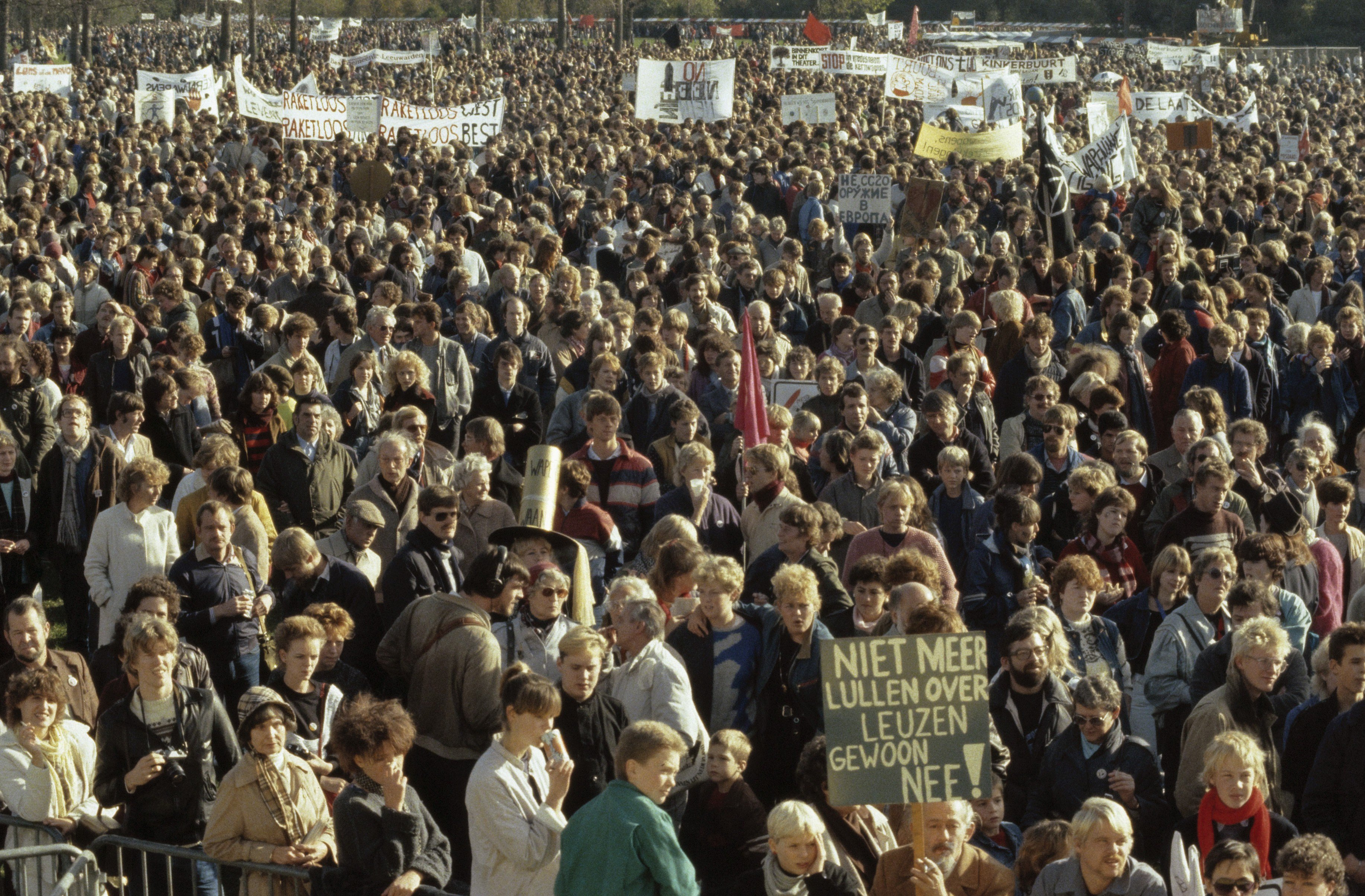
  Protest against the deployment of Pershing II missiles in Europe, Hague, 1983
- 1982 - National Library of the Netherlands building opens.
- 1983 - 29 October: Demonstration against placement of cruise missiles in Woensdrecht Air Base.
- 1984 - Korzo Theater for experimental dance and music founded.
- 1985 - Trekvlietbrug (bridge) built.
- 1986 - Historical Museum of The Hague opens
- 1987
  - Koolhaas's deconstructivist-style Lucent Danstheater built for the Netherlands Dance Theatre troupe.
  - The Hague University of Applied Sciences established.
- 1991 - International Unrepresented Nations and Peoples Organization headquartered in The Hague.
- 1992 - 16 September: Pension de Vogel homeless hostel fire.
- 1994
  - Beelden aan Zee (sculpture museum) opens.
  - Kinderboekenmuseum founded.
- 1995
  - The Hague City Hall new building constructed.
  - Yi Jun Peace Museum opens.
- 1996 - Wim Deetman becomes mayor.
- 1998
  - Europol established in The Hague.
  - Calla's restaurant in business.
- 1999 - Museum voor Communicatie active.

== 21st century ==
- 2002
  - Eurojust established in The Hague.
  - Regio Randstad regional governance group and Escher Museum established.
  - Fotomuseum Den Haag (museum for photography) opened.
  - Escher Museum opens.
- 2003
  - Hoftoren hi-rise built.
  - International Criminal Court established in The Hague.
  - Population: 463,826.
- 2004 - Police raid a safehouse of terrorist organization Hofstad Network.
- 2006 - The Hague Jazz fest begins.
- 2007
  - Regional RandstadRail 3 begins operating.
  - Kyocera Stadion (stadium) opens.
  - Het Strijkijzer hi-rise built.
  - Humanity House opens.
- 2008 - Jozias van Aartsen becomes mayor.
- 2011
  - The Hague Institute for Global Justice established.
  - Huygens Institute for the History of the Netherlands established.
  - De Kroon hi-rise built.
- 2013 - Population: 505,856 municipality.
- 2014
  - March: International 2014 Nuclear Security Summit held in city.
  - Population: 510,909 municipality; 2,261,844 metro region.
- 2017 - Pauline Krikke becomes mayor.
- 2025 - June: City hosts NATO summit.

== Images ==
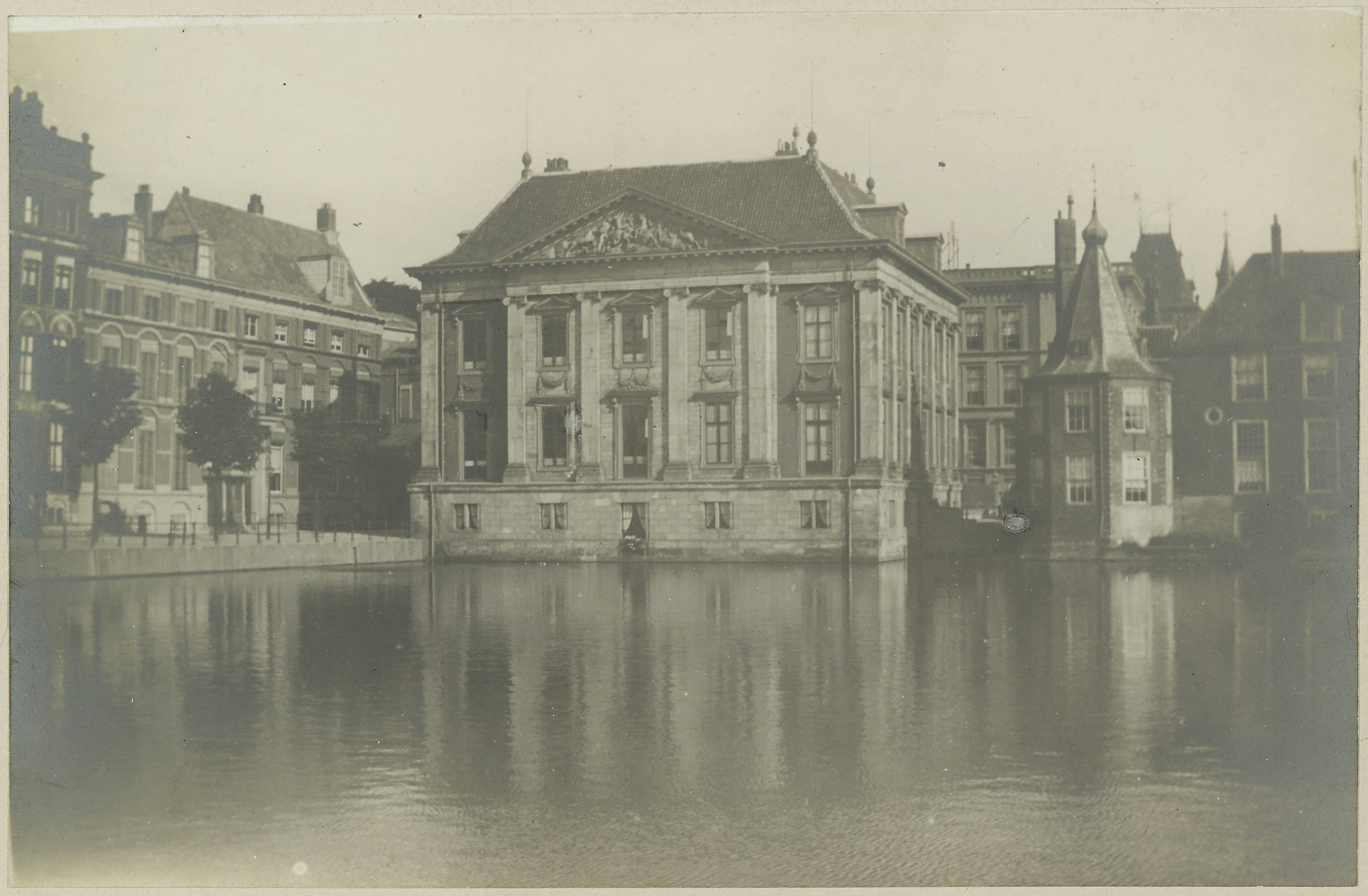
Mauritshaus, built 1644 (photo from 1903)

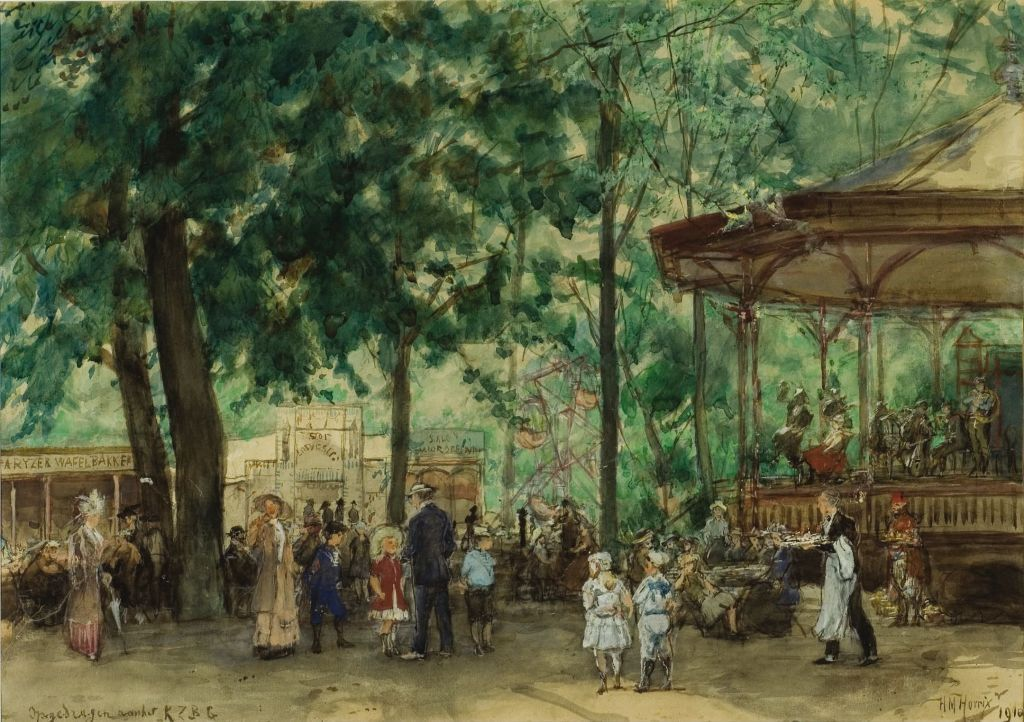
Haagse Dierentuin (zoo), established in 1863 (drawing from 1910)

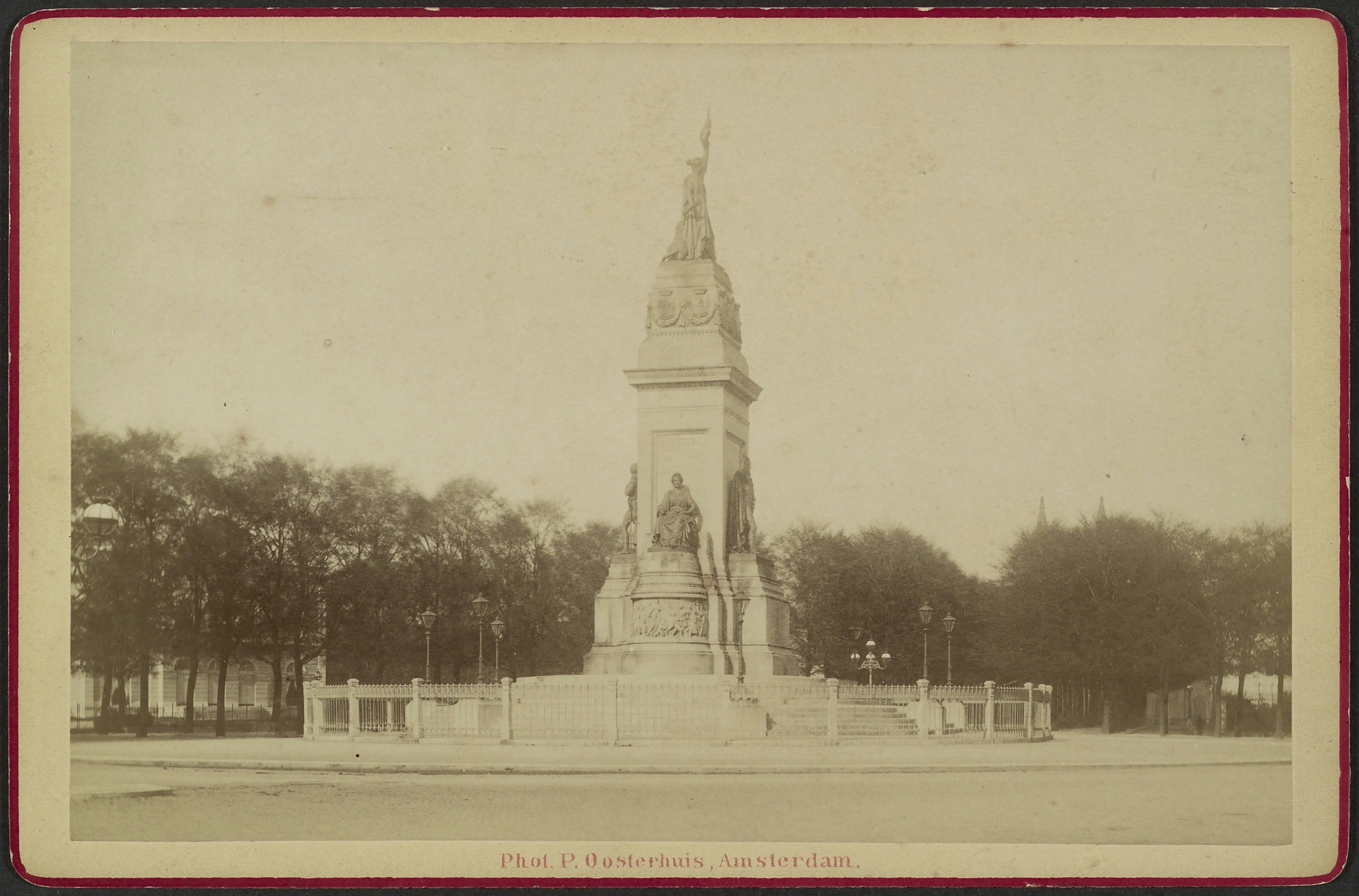
Wilhelmsplein monument, erected 1869

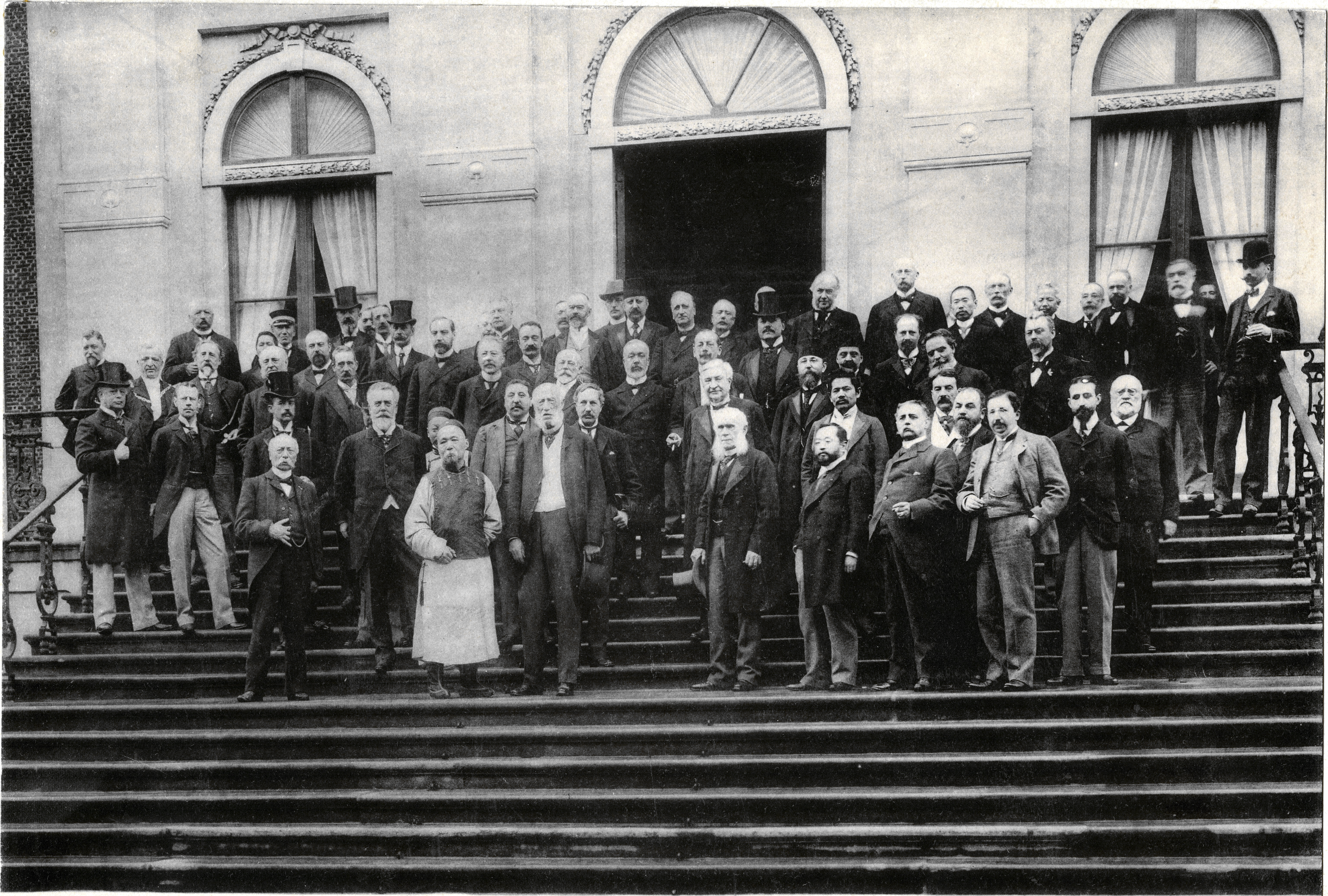
Delegates of the First International Peace Conference at The Hague, 1899

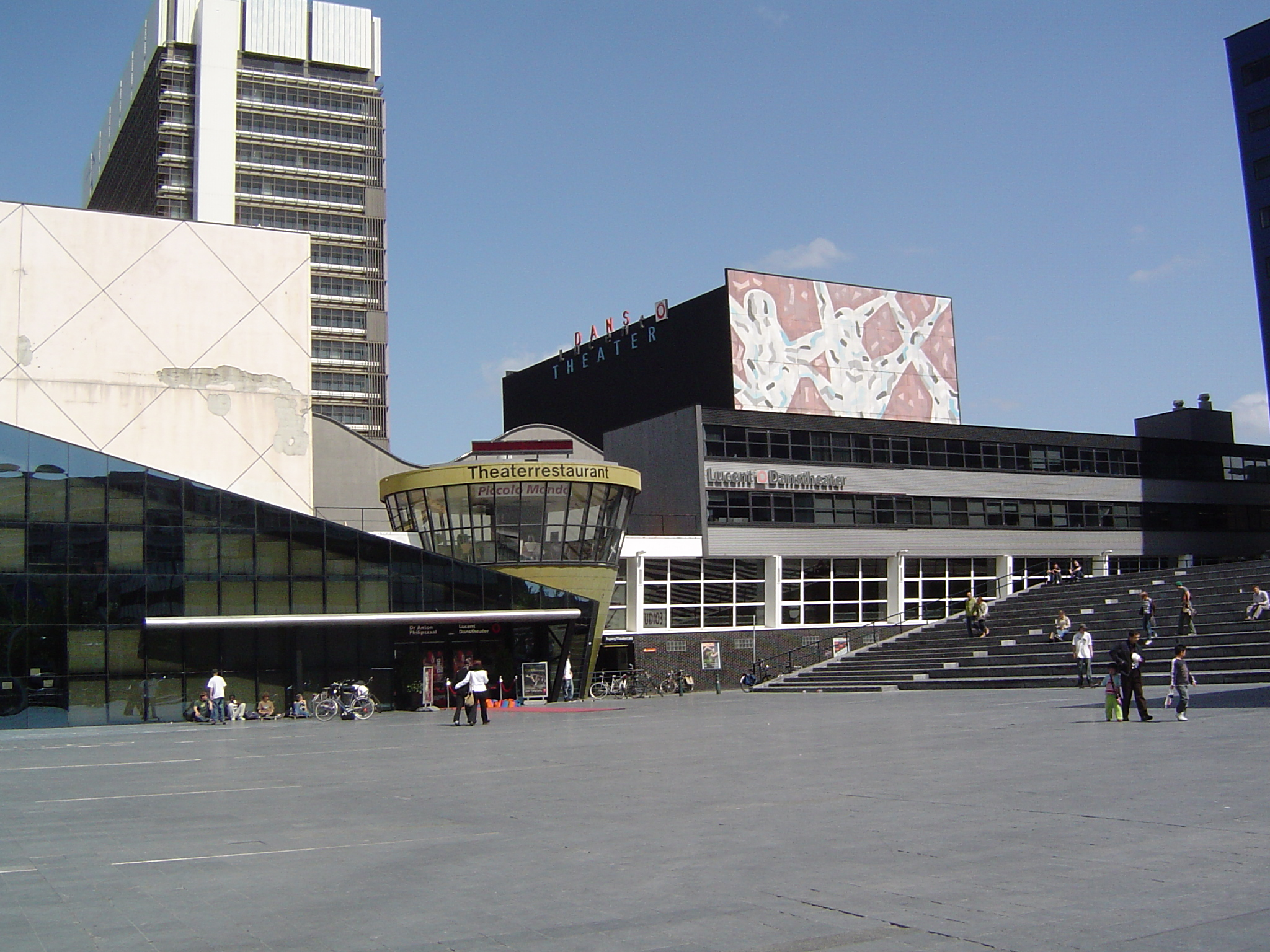
Lucent Danstheater, built 1987 (photo from 2007)

== See also ==
- The Hague history
- History of The Hague
- List of mayors of The Hague
- Other names of The Hague e.g. Haag, 'sGravenhage
- List of rijksmonuments in The Hague
- List of war memorials in The Hague
- Timelines of other municipalities in the Netherlands: Amsterdam, Breda, Delft, Eindhoven, Groningen, Haarlem, 's-Hertogenbosch, Leiden, Maastricht, Nijmegen, Rotterdam, Utrecht

== Bibliography ==
=== Published in the 18th-19th c. ===
in English

- Thomas Nugent (1749), "Hague", The Grand Tour, vol. 1: Netherlands, London: S. Birt, hdl:2027/mdp.39015030762598
- "Hague". Gazetteer of the Netherlands. London: G.G. and J. Robinson. 1794.
- "Hague". Galignani's Traveller's Guide through Holland and Belgium (4th ed.). Paris: A. and W. Galignani. 1822. hdl:2027/njp.32101073846667.
- "The Hague", A Handbook for Travellers on the Continent (8th ed.), London: John Murray, 1851
- William Henry Overall, ed. (1870). "Hague". Dictionary of Chronology. London: William Tegg. hdl:2027/uc2.ark:/13960/t9m32q949.
- George Henry Townsend (1877), "Hague", A Manual of Dates (5th ed.), London: Frederick Warne & Co., hdl:2027/hvd.32044088047865
- W. Pembroke Fetridge (1885), "The Hague", Harper's Hand-Book for Travellers in Europe and the East, New York: Harper & Brothers

in Dutch

- Haagsch jaarboekje (in Dutch), Mouton & Co., 11 September 1889, pp. 11 volumes 1889-

=== Published in the 20th-21st c. ===
in English

- "Hague". Chambers's Encyclopaedia. Vol. 5. London. 1901. hdl:2027/uc2.ark:/13960/t1fj2r624.
- Charles Bertram Black (1908), "The Hague", Holland: its Rail, Tram, and Waterways (3rd ed.), London: A. and C. Black (+ 1876 ed.)
- George Wharton Edwards (1909). "The Hague". Holland of To-day. New York: Moffat, Yard & Company. ISBN 9780849513558.
- "The Hague", Belgium and Holland (15th ed.), Leipzig: Karl Baedeker, 1910, OCLC 397759 (+ 1881 ed.)
- "Hague, The" . Encyclopædia Britannica. Vol. 12 (11th ed.). 1910. pp. 817–818.
- Benjamin Vincent (1910), "Hague", Haydn's Dictionary of Dates (25th ed.), London: Ward, Lock & Co., hdl:2027/loc.ark:/13960/t89g6g776 – via HathiTrust
- Colum Hourihane, ed. (2012). "The Hague". Grove Encyclopedia of Medieval Art and Architecture. Oxford University Press. ISBN 978-0-19-539536-5.
- Jan Hein Furnée (2014). "'Our Living Museum of Nouveaut's': Visual and Social Pleasures in The Hague's Shopping Streets, 1650-1900". In Furnée and Lesger (ed.). The Landscape of Consumption: Shopping Streets and Cultures in Western Europe, 1600-1900. Palgrave Macmillan. p. 208+. ISBN 978-1-137-31406-2.

in Dutch

- Henri Zondervan, ed. (1908), "'sGravenhage", Winkler Prins' Geillustreerde Encyclopaedie (in Dutch), Amsterdam: Uitgevers-Maatschappy "Elsevier", pp. 362–367
