= Anglo-Austrian Bank =

Former bank in Vienna

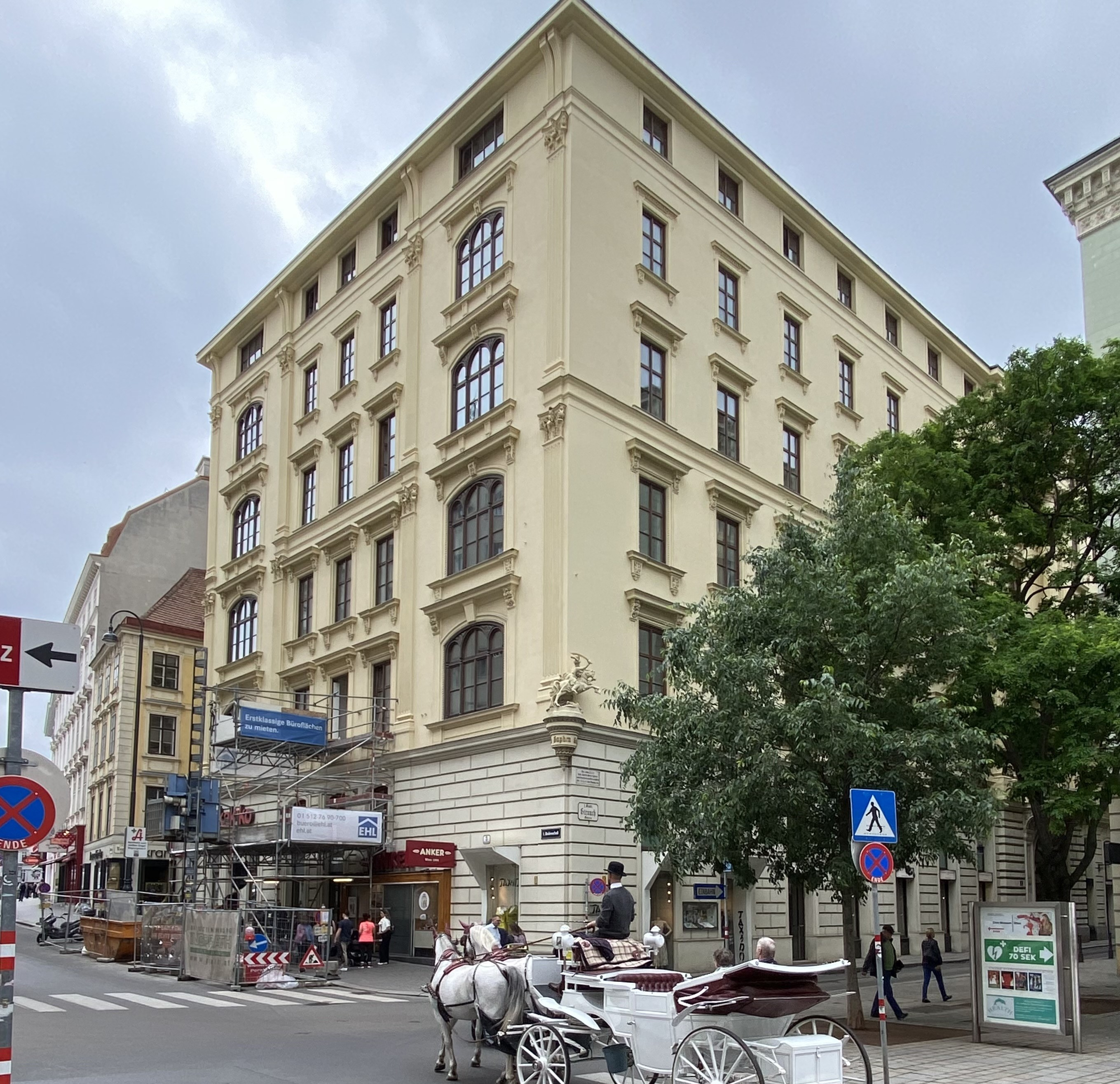
Former head office of Anglobank at Palais Montenuovo on the Freyung, Vienna

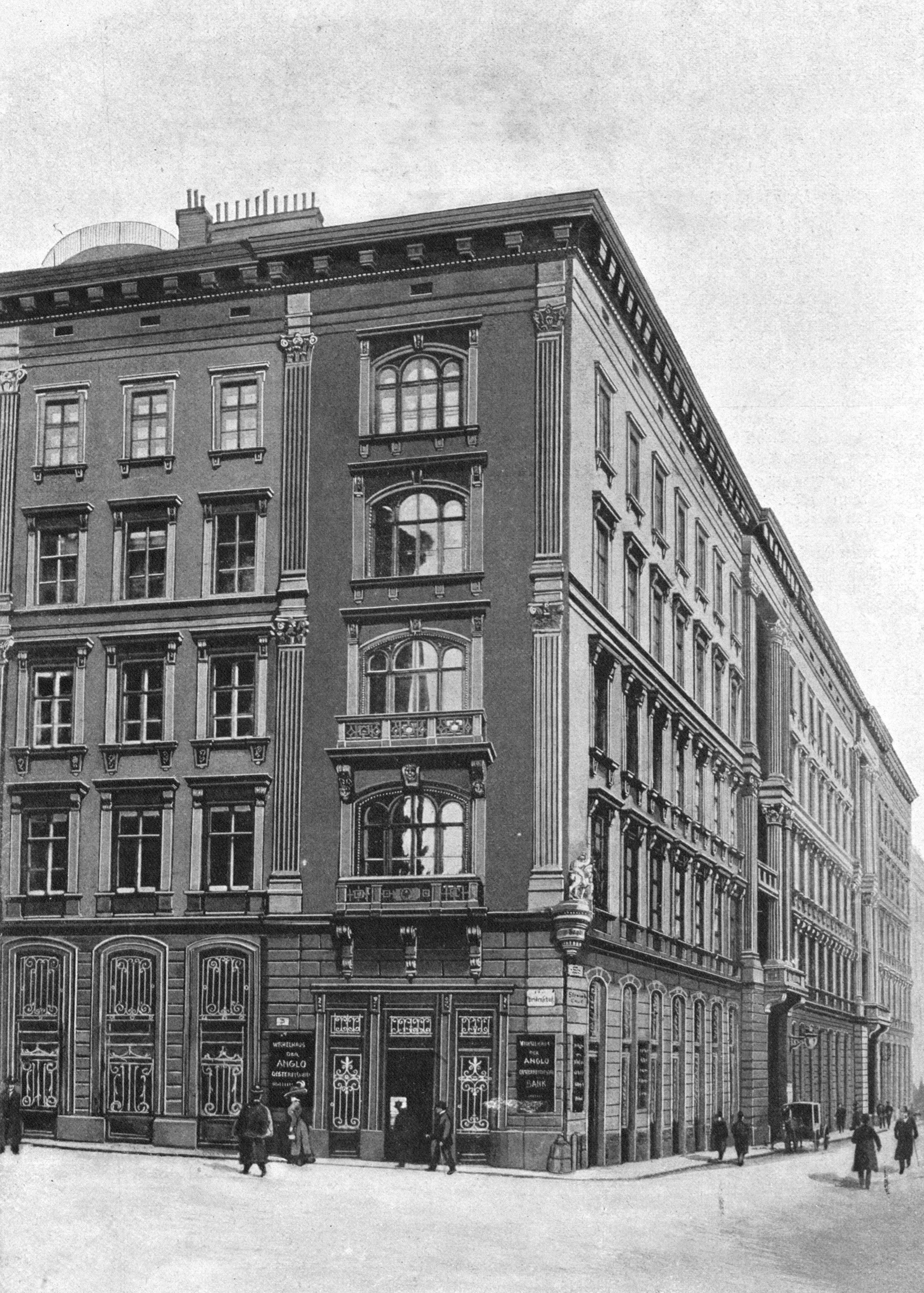
Palais Montenuovo photographed around 1910

The Anglo-Österreichische Bank (lit. 'Anglo-Austrian Bank'), in shorthand Anglobank, was a bank founded in Vienna in 1863 with an extensive branch network in the Habsburg Monarchy and later in its successor states, primarily Austria and Czechoslovakia.

Following the collapse of the monarchy, the Anglobank came under the control of the Bank of England, and in 1921, its head office was moved to London where it was restructured as the Anglo-Austrian Bank. In 1926, it was renamed Anglo-International Bank to reflect the sale that year of most of its Austrian activities to Creditanstalt. As a consequence, the Anglo-International Bank became one of the Creditanstalt's main shareholders, and played a role in the internationally consequential collapse of Creditanstalt in 1931. After 1933, Anglo-International Bank stopped making new commitments. It remained formally in business until 1951, and was eventually liquidated in 1962.

In Czechoslovakia, the former Anglobank branches were restructured in 1922 into a significant domestic bank, the Anglo-Czechoslovak Bank headquartered in Prague, which remained in activity until being absorbed by Živnostenská Banka in 1948.

From its creation until leaving Austria in 1921, the Anglobank headquarters remained located in the Palais Montenuovo at Strauchgasse 1–3, opposite the Old Vienna Stock Exchange. In 1864. The Anglobank had initially rented parts of the palace. It bought the property and remodeled it in 1871, whereby the courtyard was covered with glass and from then on served as a cash room. The building was repurposed after World War II as head office of Oesterreichische Kontrollbank.

== Habsburg era ==
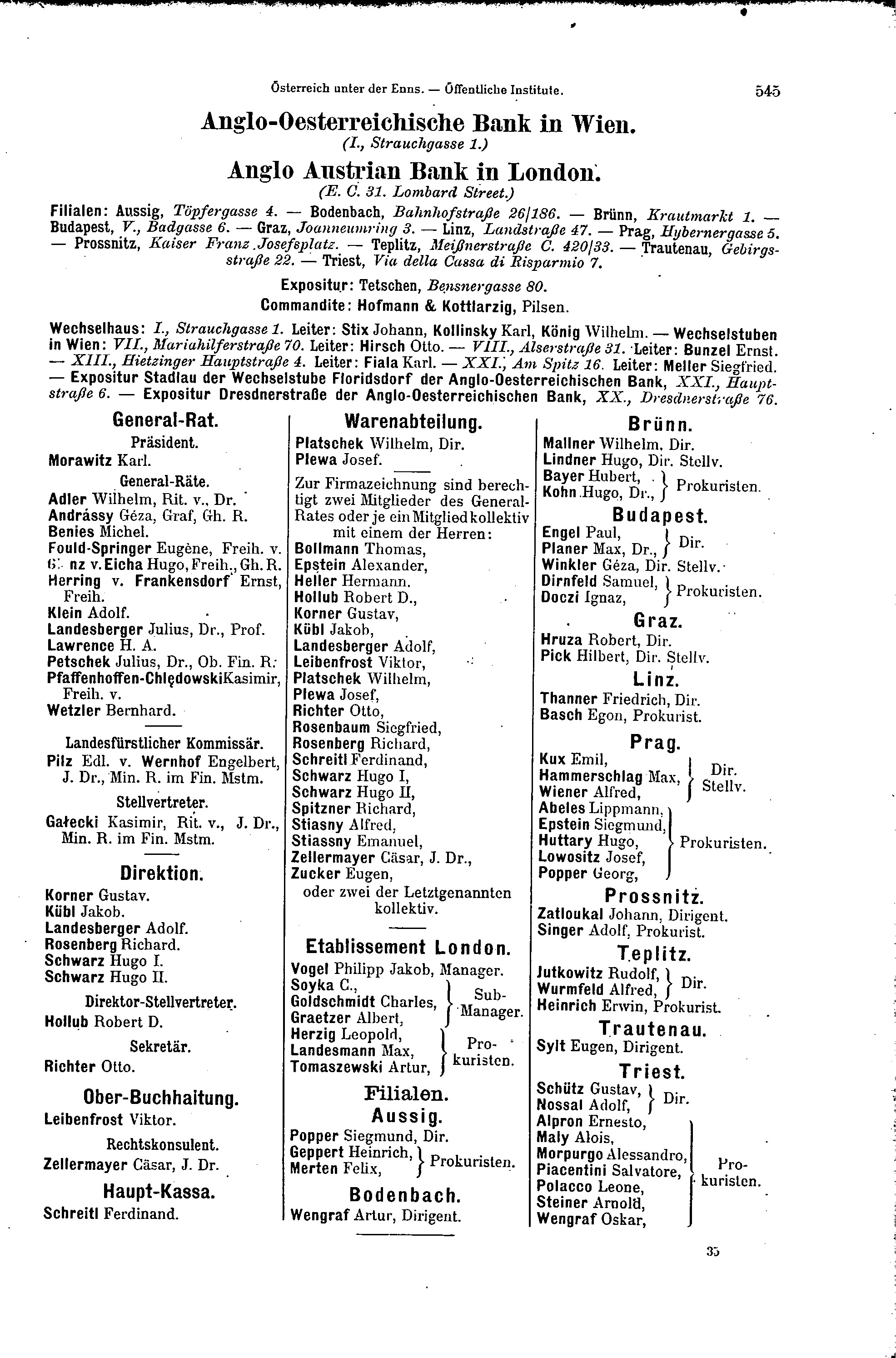
Anglobank advert, 1910, with indication of London office and branches in Aussig / now Ústí nad Labem, Bodenbach / Děčín, and Brünn / Brno, in today's Czechia, Budapest in Hungary, Graz and Linz in Austria, Prague, Prossnitz / Prostějov, Teplitz / Teplice, and Trautenau / Trutnov also now in Czechia, and Trieste now in Italy

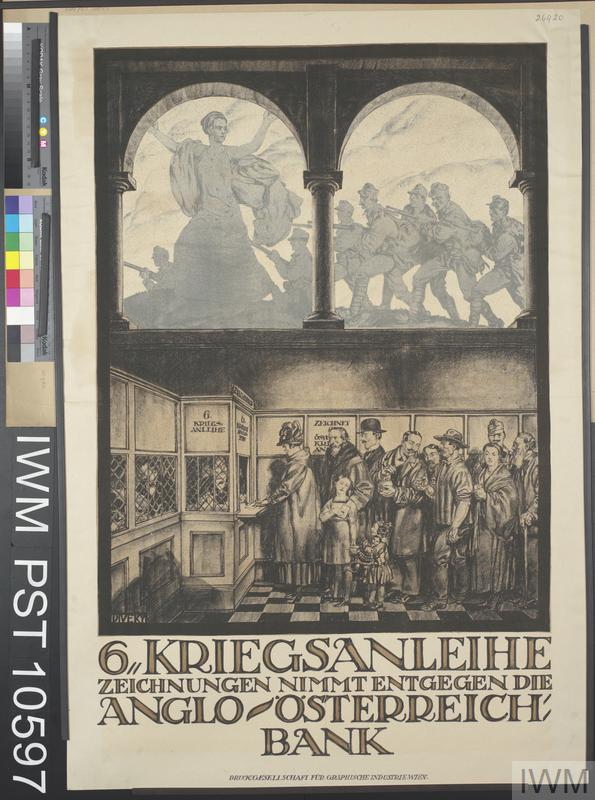
War poster, 1917

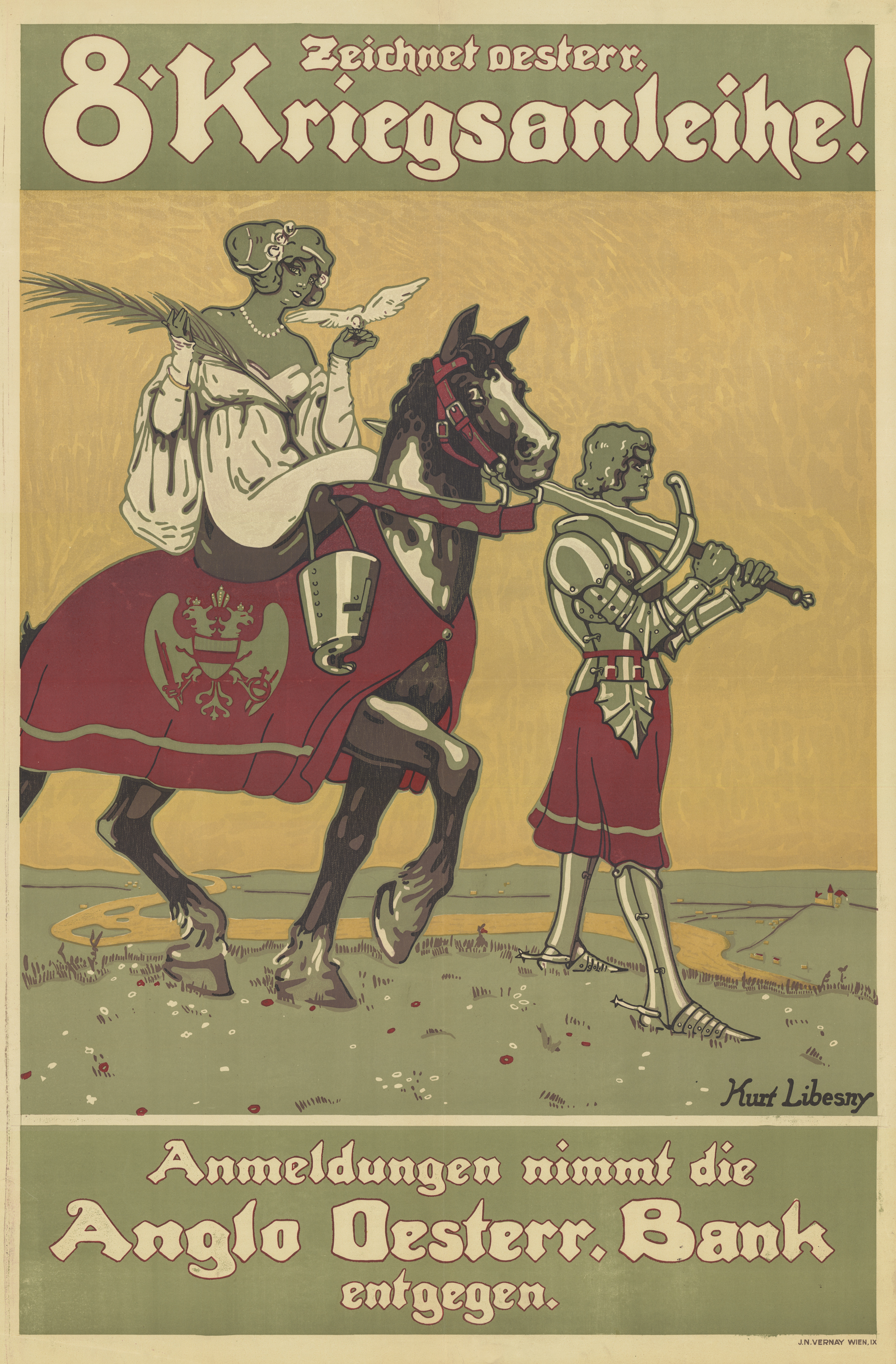
War poster, 1918

Anglo-Österreichische Bank, or Anglobank for short, was founded on 1 November 1863 in Vienna with British and Austrian capital, one of the first two “foreign banks” (the other being the Imperial Ottoman Bank, created in Constantinople that same year and known by its French acronym BIO) as opposed to the prior practice of creating domestic banks. The London bank Glyn, Mills, Leurie & Co. was significantly involved in the venture. Similarly as with the BIO, the board of directors (German: Generalrath) consisted of two committees of eight members each, one in Vienna and the other in London. The Anglobank’s initial capital was 20 million silver guilders in 100,000 shares. According to the articles of association, each member of the board of directors had to personally deposit at least 100 shares and received a fixed remuneration of 3000 silver guilders per year.

Its London office was initially established at St Mildred's Court, Poultry, and in the 1870s moved to 31, Lombard Street, where it remained until World War I.

The Anglobank soon had considerable success, with a focus on railways expansion and corporate finance especially in mining, iron and steel. From 1864 to the end of 1868, total assets nearly quadrupled. The Anglobank opened its first branch in Lemberg (now Lviv) in the 1860s. A Hungarian affiliate founded in Pest in 1867, the Anglo-Hungarian Bank (German: Anglo-Ungarische Bank), did not survive the Austro-Hungarian financial crash of 1873, but the Anglobank opened a branch in Pest and another in Prague in 1880. In 1869, the Anglobank co-founded the Austro-Ägyptische Bank in Cairo, together with the Creditanstalt. It also had four subsidiaries in Vienna, including M. L. Biedermann & Co. Bank-AG, Österreichische Kontrollbank für Industrie und Handel, and Wiener Creditbank. In 1869, the Allgemeine österreichische Baugesellschaft, a property company, was founded with the significant participation of Anglobank.

Anglobank thus became the largest competitor to the Creditanstalt, until then Austria’s dominant bank. In addition to London and Vienna, it was present in all crown lands with an extensive branch network. In Vienna alone, the company had 17 branches in 13 districts. Anglobank held a large stake in Banca Commerciale Italiana, one of Italy's largest banks. In Germany, it was a significant participant in the creation of Bayerische Vereinsbank in Munich (1869), Anglo-Deutsche Bank in Hamburg (1871), Austrian-German Bank in Frankfurt (1871), Bank für Brau-Industrie in Dresden (1899), Deutsche Vereinsbank in Frankfurt (1871), Deutsche Nationalbank in Bremen (1871) Centralbank für Industrie und Handel in Berlin (1871), and Disconto-Gesellschaft in Leipzig (1873).

Among the leading figures of Anglobank in the 1860s and 1870s were Eugen Kinsky, Julius von Kunzek, Carl von Mayer, Leon Sapieha, as well as Rudolf and Gustav von Schlesinger. After the Vienna stock market crash of 1873, which temporarily threw the company back from 2nd to 5th place among Vienna's major banks, non-aristocratic shareholders increasingly gained influence, e.g. Wilhelm Franz Exner, the brothers Adolf and Julius Landesberger, and the industrial families Petschek and Schicht. Among many high-profile customers, composer Johann Strauss II held an account at the Anglobank.

At the beginning of the 20th century, Anglobank held a leading position in the financing of the Austro-Hungarian lignite mining and in the issuance of government bonds. Its lobbying operations included participation in daily newspaper Die Presse and in the founding and financing of the magazine Der Österreichische Volkswirt. In 1913, the company had twice as many branches as the considerably larger Creditanstalt, and only slightly fewer than the Wiener Bankverein, Austria-Hungary’s leading bank by this metric.

== Interwar period ==
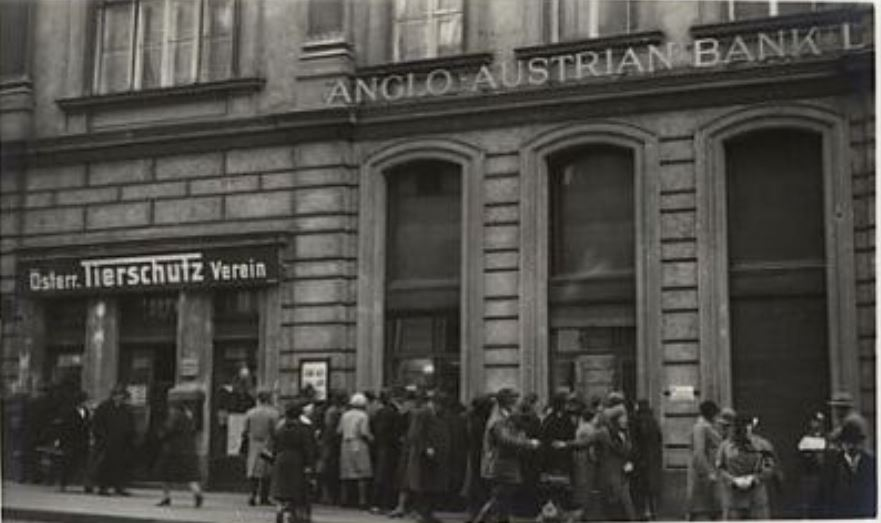
Gathering in front of the head office of Anglobank in Vienna, probably during the hyperinflation of 1921/22

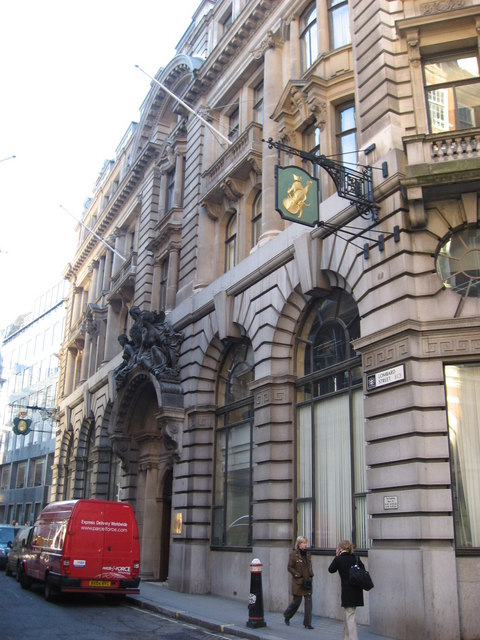
Building at 24-28, Lombard Street, the bank's London office during the interwar period

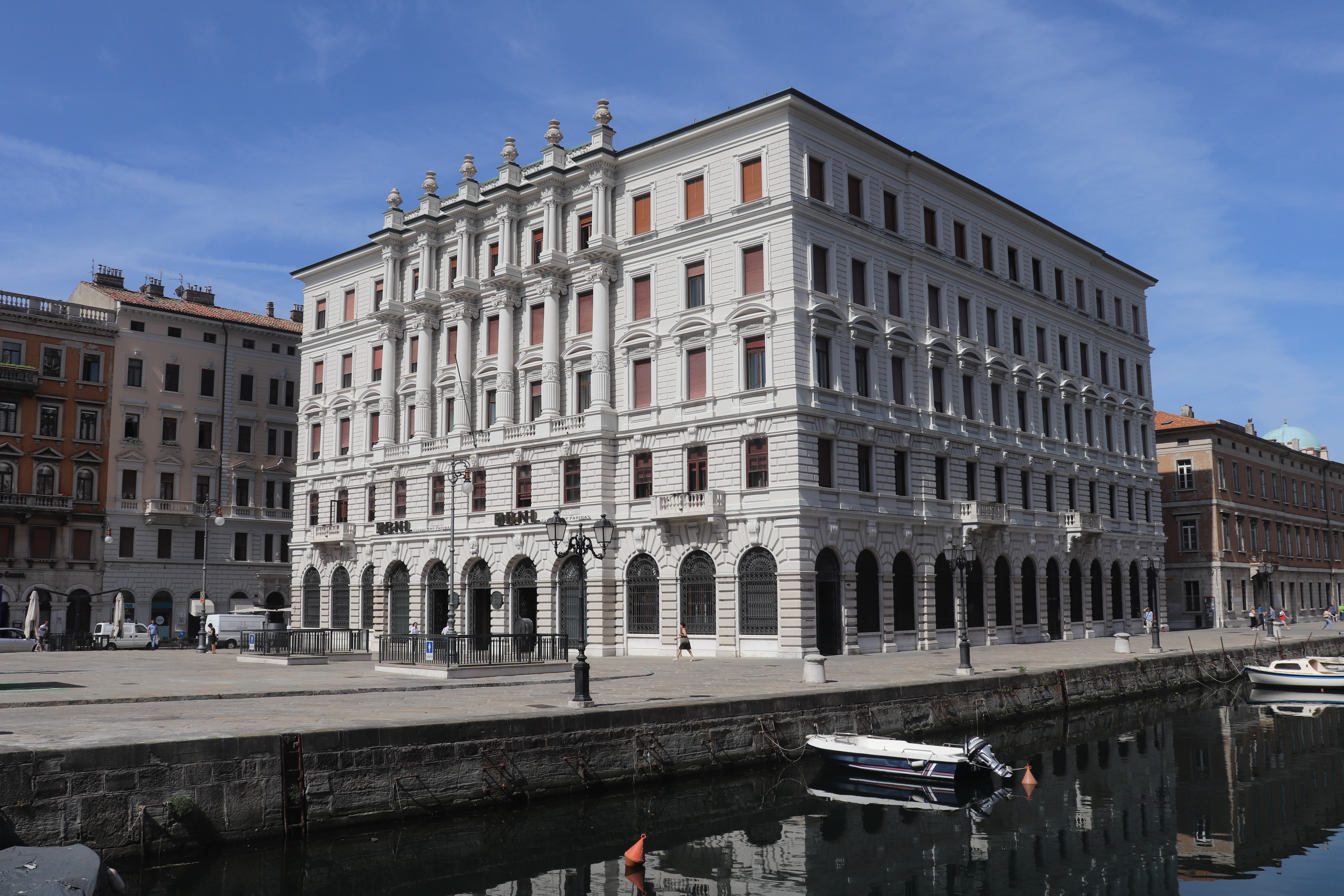
Palazzo Genel in Trieste, Anglobank branch from the early 20C to 1927

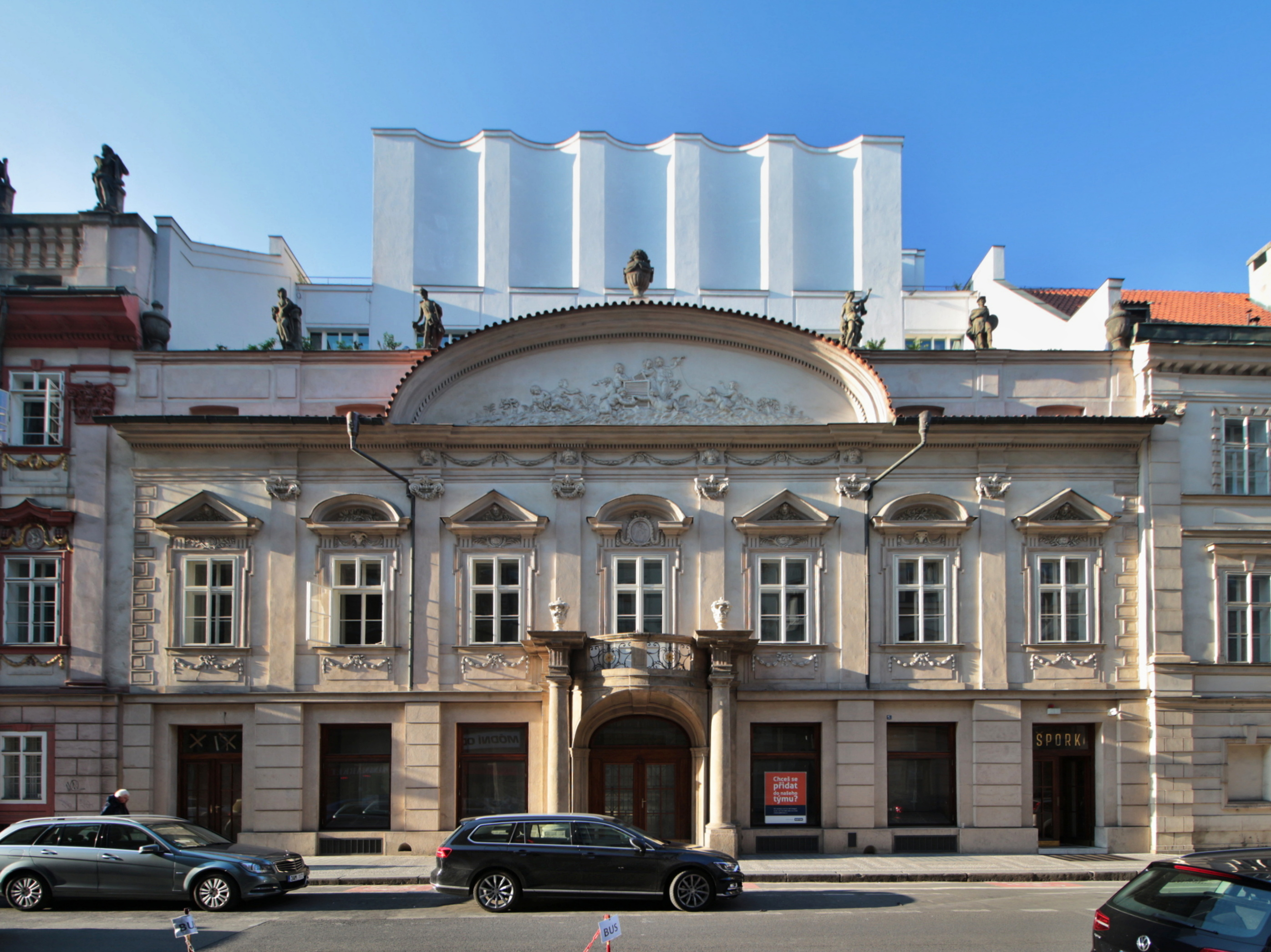
Former Anglobank branch on Hybernská, Prague, then head office of Anglo-Czechoslovak Bank

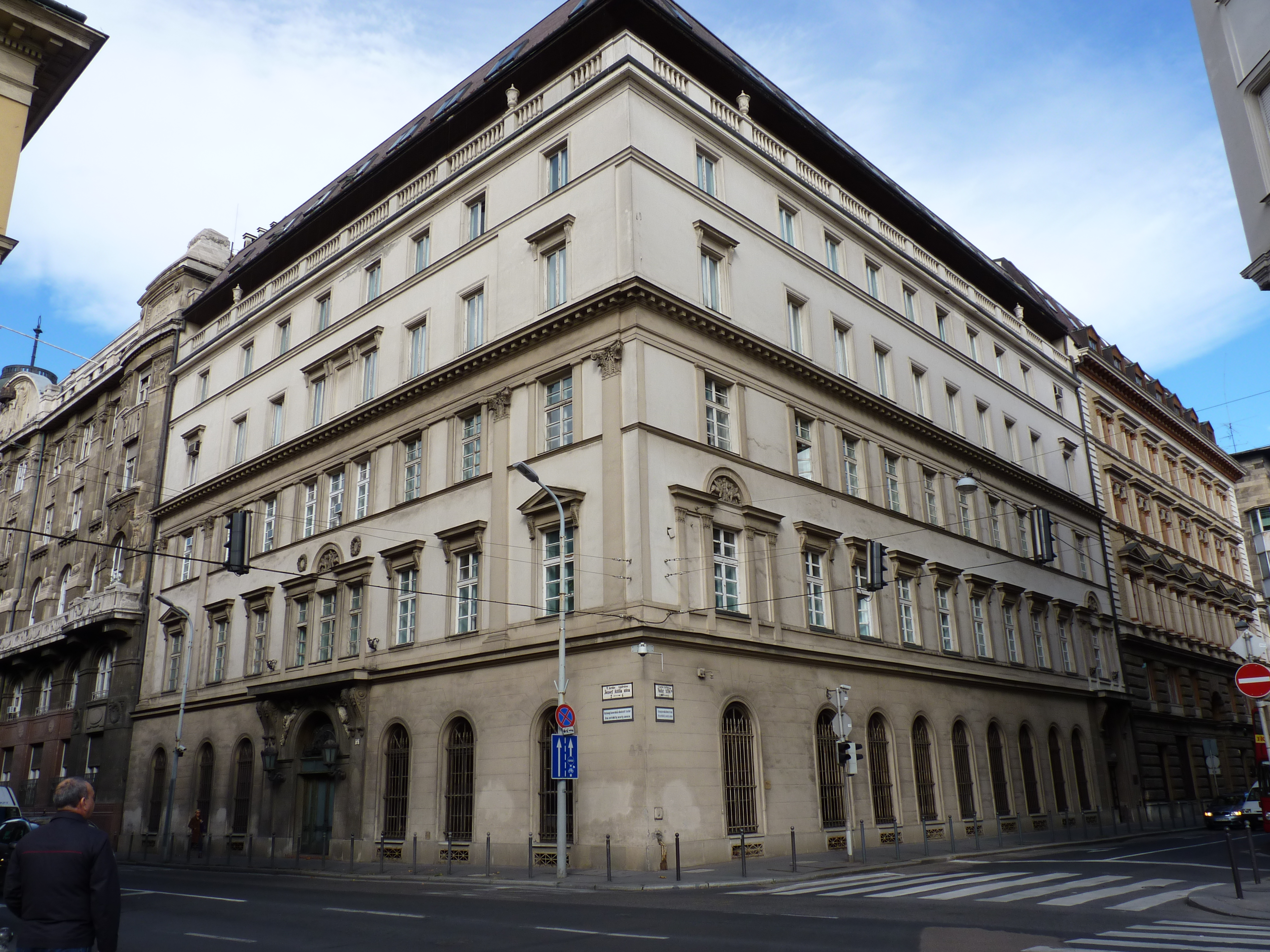
Former Anglobank branch in Pest, sold in the early 1930s

The collapse of the Habsburg monarchy had a major impact on Anglobank's business. More than 50% of its assets were in what became Czechoslovakia and Yugoslavia. As for shareholding of the bank’s capital, 33 percent was held in Austria, 45 percent in Czechoslovakia, 11 percent in Yugoslavia, and 11 percent in Hungary and Romania. Even after a number of branch closures during the war and its immediate aftermath, by 1921 Anglobank still had 22 branches in Vienna, 24 in the rest of Austria, 29 in Czechoslovakia, 3 in Hungary, 3 in Romania, 1 in Yugoslavia, and 1 in Italy (Trieste). Amid the turmoil, the Bank of England became a major shareholder of Anglobank, through the mediation of the Petschek family and under direct watch of Governor Montagu Norman. During World War I, the British authorities had already confiscated the Anglobank's business in London, which was subsequently relocated in the commercial building at 24, Lombard Street, not far from its previous location at No. 31.

On 11 December 1919, the Czechoslovak government passed a "nostrification" law, which forced owners and shareholders of companies in the territory of Czechoslovakia to accept Czechoslovak citizenship and move the headquarters of their companies to Czechoslovakia. All foreign banks had to either sell their branches to existing Czechoslovak credit institutions or convert them into new Czechoslovak entities, within a tight time frame. Norman did not accept this deadline, however, and used his leverage to negotiate an exemption from the Czechoslovak authorities. The Anglo-Czechoslovak Bank began operations in Czechoslovakia on 12 April 1922, under full ownership of the Anglo-Austrian Bank until 1927.

The balance sheet of Anglobank showed assets of 4,219,992,786 crowns as at 31 December 1919. With retroactive effect, the General Assembly on 25 April 1920 decided on a profit distribution of 10.83% for 1917, 6.25% for 1918 and 10% for 1919. At the same time, the shareholders approved a capital increase from 150,000,000 crowns to 200,000,216 crowns. Simultaneously, Anglobank created a subsidiary in Vaduz, the Bank in Liechtenstein AG (BiL, later LGT Group), which began operations on 24 November 1920. A main reason for the establishment of BiL was the goal of Austrian companies and banks to merge their subsidiaries, which were isolated in the formed successor states, into holding companies and to have them managed from a neutral country. As a result, the BiL became a pioneer of the holding business in Liechtenstein.

=== Relocation to London and aftermath ===
The Anglobank moved its headquarters from Vienna to London on 7 October 1921. On 27 March 1922, a separate entity named Anglo-Austrian Bank was founded in London, which took over all assets and liabilities of Anglobank with all its syndicated holdings. The former share capital of 200 million kroner was converted to 650,000 pounds sterling. The conversion balance showed a significant reserve of 125 billion crowns. The new board of directors consisted of ten representatives of the Bank of England and six representatives of the previous shareholders. The Bank of England had achieved this position through an exchange of debts (incurred during the war and the hyperinflation of 1921/22) against preferred shares and certificates of indebtedness at the debt’s par value. About two-thirds of the ordinary shares of Anglobank remained in the possession of pre-war owners in Austria and the other successor countries, mostly small shareholders.

As a consequence, and unlike surviving domestic Austrian banks, the Anglo-Austrian Bank had ample ability to lend and became a conduit for the allocation of British capital to the Austrian economy. The Bank of England lobbied actively albeit unsuccessfully against the establishment of a new Austrian central bank, which was planned for the summer of 1922. On its behalf, the English board of directors of the Anglo-Austrian Bank wrote a letter to UK Prime Minister David Lloyd George, pointing out the "urgent need" to support the Austrian government through external "aid measures (…) which alone could prevent serious crises". They argued that a new central bank would not achieve lasting success but only undermine private institutions whose continued strength was critical to Austrian recovery. Nevertheless, The Austrian National Council passed a federal law of 24 July 1922 to established the Oesterreichische Nationalbank (OeNB), which started operations on 1 January 1923. Nevertheless, the Bank of England was able to retain influence and impose its deflationary preferences. Officials from the Bank of England, Robert Charles Kay and later Anton van Gyn, sat on the OeNB's supervisory board as official observers and financial controllers.

Significant investments of the Anglo-Austrian Bank directly in Austria included Austro-Daimler, Austro-Fiat, Puch works, Brevillier & Urban, Schoeller-Bleckmann Steel Works, Enzesfeld metal works, Universal Bau AG, Powder factory Skodawerke-Wetzler AG, ELIN AG, DELKA shoe industry and trade AG, Herlango AG, Josef Manner & Comp. Inc., and Bed feather and sheet factory Adolf Gans AG. The bank also kept operations and investments in the broader Central and Southeastern Europe, which became de facto controlled by the Bank of England. In 1924, Anglo-Austrian Bank had 18 branches in Vienna, 13 in the rest of Austria, two in Hungary, two in Romania, one in Yugoslavia, and three in Italy.

Even so, the breakdown of trade relations between the successor states and the increased appeal of economic autarky meant that the flows of British capital deployed in the region through the Anglo-Austrian Bank remained limited. The advocacy of freer intra-regional trade by the Bank of England and Anglo-Austrian Bank was generally unsuccessful. By 1925, Southeast European economy were plagued by recession and inflation. Only the operations in Czechoslovakia were profitable, making the Anglo-Czechoslovak Bank the most important asset of the Anglo-Austrian Bank at the time. In January 1925, the London controllers determined that the balance sheet of the Anglo-Austrian Bank's branch in Vienna would be in deficit for 1924. This gave concrete form to the Bank of England's considerations of giving up the bank’s Austrian base.

=== Sale of the Austrian operations and restructuring into Anglo-International Bank ===
The Anglo-Austrian Bank management announced that it would "reduce its involvement throughout Central Europe and place it on a new, less risky basis." The first step was the sale of all the bank’s branches and investments in Italy to Banca Italo-Britannica in January 1926, in exchange for shares of the acquirer. At the same time, Zoltan Hajdu, the bank’s newly appointed general director for Austria, started tightening the bank’s lending and downsizing the 2,000-strong administrative structure in Austria. Negotiations began with Wiener Bankverein, then shifted to Creditanstalt which bought most of the Vienna branches and other assets on 12 June 1926, while some of the bank's investments went to a Dutch holding company.

The Anglo-Austrian Bank then merged with the British Trade Corporation (est. 1917) to form the Anglo-International Bank on 1926. It began trading on 1 October 1926. The initial capital was £2.36 million. The main shareholders were the Bank of England and Glyn, Mills & Co. The new institution was no longer a universal bank, but rather lent to other banks abroad. Neither the sale of the Austrian business nor the merger involved any consultation of the Austrian ordinary shareholders, who learned about the transactions from the newspapers. Only in January 1927 was an extraordinary general assembly convened, which completed the elimination of the retail shareholders from representation on the bank’s board of directors. The previous shareholders only received one share in Anglo-International Bank for four shares in Anglo-Austrian Bank; there was no vote on the conversion. According to applicable English regulations, the Austrian shareholders did not even have the right to appear at the general meeting in London.

The 1926 sale has often been referred to in Austria as the collapse of the Anglo-Österreichische Bank and the first step in banking sector consolidation in Austria. Formally, however, the Anglo-Österreichische Bank had already been replaced by a foreign institution in 1921. The reference Viennese business newspaper Die Börse stated in retrospect about the end of the Anglobank in Austria (excerpts): "The bank played an extremely important role in the history of Austria's reconstruction. It did so by building a bridge between London and Vienna, by attracting British financial circles to Austria at a time when the horizon was still completely overcast, and by persuading Austria that powerful forces were at work to help it. But this beneficial result ceased when the Austrian stabilization plan was implemented and the connection with the Bank of England began to bear fruit."

After the Creditanstalt took over the Anglobank branches in Vienna, the Austrian economy became even more dependent on the Bank of England, because the Anglo-International Bank, which was now under the total control of the Bank of England, subsequently acted as one of the largest shareholders in Creditanstalt, by then the largest Austrian bank. In addition to the large ownership stake in Creditanstalt, the Anglo-International Bank acquired all of Creditanstalt's previous overseas business in the UK. Zoltan Hajdu became a member of the supervisory board (German: Verwaltungsrat) and later of the executive board (German: Vorstand) of the Creditanstalt. Letzten Endes war die Bank of England über die Anglo-International Bank nicht nur Aktionär, sondern auch Gläubiger der Creditanstalt.

The Anglo-International Bank went on to sell its other assets. By 1927, it sold much of its holdings in the Anglo-Czechoslovak Bank. The Budapest branch continued to exist for some time and was taken over in the early 1930s by the British and Hungarian Bank (Hungarian: Angol-Magyar Bank, est. 1890 as Magyar Kerskedelmi Rt. and renamed in 1920), for which the Anglo-International Bank received shares in the British and Hungarian Bank. The Anglo-Austrian Bank had earlier sold its branch in Zagreb to the Croatian Discount Bank, and also sold its branch in Belgrade to the Bosnian Agrarian and Commercial Bank, again against blocks of shares and seats on supervisory boards. After the merger of these institutes to form the Yugoslav United Bank, the Anglo-International Bank held a stake in one of Yugoslavia’s largest banks. A similar pattern applied in Romania.

Ostensibly, the Bank of England was pursuing political rather than economic goals with the Anglo-International Bank, which did not pay any dividends during its existence, but used its gains to offset write-offs. France and the UK viewed with extreme suspicion the growing tendencies towards an economic union with Germany that had existed in Austria since the end of the First World War. To counteract them, the UK provided the Austrian economy and the government with more support loans than any other country. At the same time, the Bank of England tried to expand its influence in Germany, for which the Anglo-International Bank would also serve as an instrument. As a result, at the request of the Bank of England, Anglo-International Bank undertook a number of commitments, including the issue of a German government bond. However, the company was unable to gain a foothold in Germany in the long term. The German financial economy had initially recovered to such an extent that in June 1928 the Deutsche Bank wanted to buy the Bank of England's stake in the Anglo-International Bank. The Bank of England, of course, turned down the offer.

The Anglo-International Bank’s own board of directors consisted almost exclusively of representatives of the Bank of England and political officials. These included its chairman Herbert Lawrence, managing director Pyotr Bark, and supervisory board members including Otto Niemeyer, Gordon Nairne, Alexander Henderson, Henry Strakosch, Harry Viscount, and William Barclay Peat, several of whom were also members of the House of Commons or House of Lords. Zoltan Hajdu, who was the only continental European representative on the board of directors of Anglo-International Bank, did not act independently from Montagu Norman and effectively represented the interests of the Bank of England. He became a member of the board of directors of the Allgemeine Bodencreditanstalt (from 1922), the Creditanstalt (from 1926), and the Amstelbank, and a member of the supervisory boards of large banks and industrial companies in Yugoslavia, Romania and Hungary. In addition, as a large landowner, Hajdu had an estate and numerous properties in western Hungary.

=== Austrian crisis of 1931 and subsequent liquidation ===
Between 1925 and 1930, the foreign debt of the major Austrian banks rose from around 370 million to 980 million schillings. The English banks in particular stood out with their generous granting of short-term foreign loans. US investors also increasingly appeared as lenders. This led to a constant oversupply, which led observers to speak of the "pushiness" of short-term loans from Western banks. On the other hand, German banks were interested in long-term investment of their funds and long-term customer loyalty, which Austrian companies also preferred in view of the calculability of liabilities. Austrian interest rates were higher than German for almost the entire 1920s. Various members of the General Council of the Oesterreichische Nationalbank repeatedly called for a reduction in the discount rate in order to curb the undesirably high inflow of short-term foreign credits. However, they could not assert themselves against the financial controllers of the Bank of England and Richard Reisch, the President of the OeNB, because they saw no need for defensive measures in the event of a temporary external debt. They assumed that "serious institutions" would not pass on short-term foreign loans as investment loans. But that is exactly what Austrian credit institutions did, above all the Bodencreditanstalt, which was the first of the big banks to collapse in 1929.

The exact role of Zoltan Hajdu and the Anglo-International Bank in the Austrian banking crisis remains a matter of controversy. He advocated a merger of the Bodencreditanstalt with the Creditanstalt as early as the turn of the year 1927/28. The project was implemented in November 1929 despite strong reluctance from Louis Rothschild, the president of the Creditanstalt. Zoltan Hajdu led the merger negotiations as a member of the Bodencreditanstalt Executive Committee. After the merger, he moved from the Supervisory Board of Creditanstalt to the Management Board. In addition, Otto Ernst Niemeyer and Pyotr Bark remained on the Creditanstalt Supervisory Board as representatives of the Anglo-International Bank.

On 5 March 1931, Germany and Austria announced a customs union without giving Great Britain and France any prior notice; the latter used different strategies that caused the project to fail in the autumn of 1931. On the one hand, a formal protest was lodged at the announcement of a customs union, since the Versailles Treaty prohibited the two states from rapprochement. On the other hand, foreign creditors withdrew loans by leaps and bounds. In addition, France officially declared that it would "reclaim short-term debt securities from Austrian and German banks and not extend them any longer." Shortly thereafter, the largest insolvency case in Austrian banking history occurred.

The Creditanstalt, which through the takeover of the Bodencreditanstalt had become by far the most important bank in Austria with an extensive network of industrial participations, had until then been regarded as an extremely sound institution. On 8 May 1931, it announced that it had suffered extraordinary losses of 140 million schillings, triggering a bank run. The announcement of the losses was apparently coerced by Zoltan Hajdu, who refused to sign a company balance sheet that he had commissioned himself, and which showed that the bank's industrial holdings had been overvalued and that the merger with the Bodencreditanstalt had resulted in losses of 60 million schillings. The exact background as to why the management of the Creditanstalt suddenly opted for public disclosure of a marked-to-market valuation of its assets, at the worst possible moment, remains unclear. British economic historian Harold James put it sarcastically as "Zoltan Hajdu experienced some sort of religious conversion and thereafter felt unable to live with the dishonest accounts his institution presented for two years and he had signed.”

The Austrian Ministry of Justice filed claims for damages of 20 million schillings and on 15 October 1931 applied to the Vienna public prosecutor's office for the confiscation of assets and preliminary investigations against Zoltan Hajdu and other directors of the Creditanstalt. However, criminal proceedings could not be initiated because Hajdu, like most of the other responsible board members, had fled abroad and a voluntary return to Austria was not to be expected. No investigations were initiated against the members of the Supervisory Board of Anglo-International Bank, Bark and Niemeyer. They helped Creditanstalt get a generous bridging loan from the Bank of England. The preliminary proceedings against Zoltan Hajdu were also discontinued in November 1933. He remained on the board of directors of the Anglo-International Bank until 1938 and bought another property in Hungary for 500,000 schillings. Hajdu was even able to keep his villa in Vienna, from where he managed the business of the Anglo-International Bank in Yugoslavia.

All the same, the Anglo-International Bank's reputation was badly damaged. After the events, Herbert A. Lawrence was replaced as chairman by Sir Bertram Hornsby, who was chairman of the Central Bank of Egypt from 1921 to 1931. Hornsby described the work of the Anglo-International Bank as "no good advertising for the British financial world"; he failed to improve either the reputation or the financial position of the institution. More retail shareholders sold their remaining Anglo shares. Ultimately, the Bank of England bailed out Anglo-International Bank with £1 million and bought up Anglo shares on the open market to prevent a full share price collapse, but these efforts turned out to be unsuccessful. In November 1933, the Bank of England initiated a "privately organized liquidation" of the Anglo-International Bank.

In December 1933, more than half of the staff still employed in London were made redundant. Montagu Norman, however, kept the plans a secret because, in his judgment, a formal bankruptcy would have permanently damaged the aura of British finance. Thus, the Anglo-International Bank remained technically in existence through the remainder of the 1930s, although it did not generate any new business or revenue streams. In 1943, the Bank of England put the loss since 1927 from its support of Anglo-International Bank, including share purchases, at around £1.6 million. A year later, the Bank of England transferred all of its Anglo holdings, along with what little debt remained, to Glyn, Mills & Co., which placed the assets in a specially formed trust called Continental Assets Realization Trust Ltd. Formally, the Anglo-International Bank remained licensed until 1951, and was only finally liquidated in 1962. To protect trademark rights, a shell company has existed since 1963, which indicates its origin in the Anglo-Austrian Bank founded in 1863.

== Short-lived brand revival in 2019 ==
=== Meinl Bank ===
In June 2019, in the context of the difficulties of Austria's Meinl Bank and resignation of its chairman Julius Meinl V, that bank was renamed Anglo Austrian AAB Bank.

At the request of the Austrian Financial Market Authority (FMA), the European Central Bank (ECB) withdrew the banking licence of the bank on 15 November 2019. Using this as a pretext, the FMA had liquidators for the bank appointed who on 2 March 2020 filed an application for insolvency which was granted one day later. Appeals against all three decisions in this regard – the withdrawal of the banking licence by the ECB, the appointment of liquidators, and the opening of insolvency proceedings – were filed in the respective courts. While the appeals with respect to the licence withdrawal and the appointment of the liquidators were still pending, the Austrian Supreme Court (OGH) ruled on 13 July 2020 that the opening of insolvency proceedings against the bank had been unlawful. The FMA immediately filed a new application for insolvency which was again found unlawful by the Vienna Appeals Court in August 2020.

A major argument for the withdrawal of the banking licence was the FMA's allegation that the bank was involved in money laundering transactions. Prior to and parallel to the licence withdrawal process, the FMA had filed several criminal complaints against the bank and its (former) managers with the Vienna prosecutors. However, the Vienna prosecutors – after years of investigations, involving judicial assistance from around the world and investigators travelling to foreign jurisdictions – dismissed all such allegations on 26 May 2020 and closed the respective proceedings in connection with money laundering against the bank and its (former) managers, as none of the alleged criminal involvement brought forward by the FMA could withstand scrutiny.

In June 2022, the European Union's General Court confirmed the European Central Bank's revocation of the bank's banking licence. In September 2024, the European Court of Justice rejected an appeal and the verdict became final.

== See also ==
- Niederösterreichische Escompte-Gesellschaft
- Wiener Bankverein
- Länderbank
- List of banks in Austria
