= SNS Reaal =

Dutch bank

SNS REAAL N.V.
- Type: Naamloze vennootschap under public ownership
- Traded as: Euronext: SR
- Industry: Financial services
- Founded: 1997
- Defunct: 30 September 2015
- Headquarters: Utrecht, Netherlands
- Key people: Gerard van Olphen (CEO), Rob Zwartendijk (Chairman of the supervisory board)
- Products: Retail banking, insurance
- Revenue: €7.068 billion (2010)
- Net income: ▼ (€225 million) (2010)
- Total assets: €127.67 billion (end 2010)
- Total equity: €4.833 billion (end 2010)
- Number of employees: 7,110 (FTE, 2010)
- Subsidiaries: ASN Bank, AXA Nederland, REAAL, SNS Bank, SNS Regiobank, Zwitsersleven
- Website: www.snsreaal.nl

SNS REAAL was a Dutch financial institution in insurance and banking which focused on the private market and small to medium businesses. It became a government-owned corporation after its nationalisation in 2013 and in 2017 .

The services to private and corporate clients are mainly from SNS Bank and insurance brand REAAL. SNS Bank served its customers through its own stores, independent intermediaries, internet, and telephone. REAAL sold its products and services exclusively through independent brokers.

As of 2011 the company had assets amounting to €132 billion, with about 7,000 full-time equivalent employees.

== IPO ==
SNS was listed on the Euronext Amsterdam from 18 May 2006 until 31 January 2013. The "Foundation SNS REAAL" sold part of its stake in the company, its share decreased from 100% to 65.5%. The sale resulted in proceeds of approximately €950 million. At the flotation, SNS REAAL also gave out about 25 million new shares, this yielded €415 million. The shares were placed at a price of €17 each. End of 2006, the market capitalization of SNS amounted to €3.9 billion. The importance of the foundation in SNS later fell to just over 50%.

== Early history ==
In 1997, SNS founded subsidiary SNS Asset Management, a company focussing on microfinance.

In 1998, SNS founded Proteq Dier & Zorg (English: "Animal and care"), a wholly owned subsidiary providing insurance for pets. In 2014, it was rebranded as Reaal Dier & Zorg.

== Acquisitions ==
The bank used the money raised as part of the IPO for acquisitions and in particular wanted to buy an insurance company. 2006 and 2007 saw three major acquisitions: Bouwfonds, AXA, and Zwitserleven.

=== Bouwfonds ===
In the summer of 2006, Bouwfonds Property Finance (BPF) was acquired, which was part of Bouwfonds Nederlandse Gemeenten NV, a former semi-public company that is mainly focused on owner-occupied homes and mortgages. The fund was fully privatized in 2005, because the latter municipalities sold their shares to the new owner ABN AMRO. In 2005, BPF had a net profit of €87 million. After the acquisition, the part resumed its activities under the name SNS Property Finance.

Seller ABN AMRO received €810 million for this activity. SNS REAAL strengthened in this way its position in the small to medium business market, and reduced its dependence on the mortgage market. At end of 2006, the loan portfolio of SNS Property Finance's was valued at €8.8 billion, of which 77% was in the Netherlands. Eventually, this acquisition ended up disastrous for SNS REAAL. The depreciation on real estate purchase eventually led to the forced nationalization of SNS REAAL on 1 February 2013.

=== AXA ===
In early June 2007 it was announced that SNS Reaal took over the Dutch activities of the French insurance group AXA for an amount of €1.75 billion. This acquisition included AXA Nederland, Winterthur Nederland, and DBV Hypotheken .

This was partly financed by the issuance of new shares. After this acquisition, SNS was the fifth player in the Dutch insurance market. Only Eureko, ING, Fortis and Aviva have a larger share. The acquisition increases the market share, on the basis of the premium, to over 9%.

SNS discontinued its use of the AXA and Winterthur brands, in 2007 it started full integration of AXA Nederland and Winterthur Nederland activities into Zwitserleven.

In 2009, SNS announced the DBV Hypotheken brand would be discontinued and fully integrated as well.

=== Zwitserleven ===
In November 2007, SNS REAAL acquired the Dutch and Belgian activities of Zwitserleven. With this takeover, SNS REAAL became the second-largest pension and life insurance company in the Netherlands. SNS reportedly paid €1.5 billion, which was almost 17 times the annual profit for the acquisition.

== Capital injections ==
As a direct result of the credit crunch SNS received €750 million from the government in November 2008. The government received in exchange for this special effects based on a price of €5.25 per piece, under the Dutch standard terms.

== Nationalisation ==
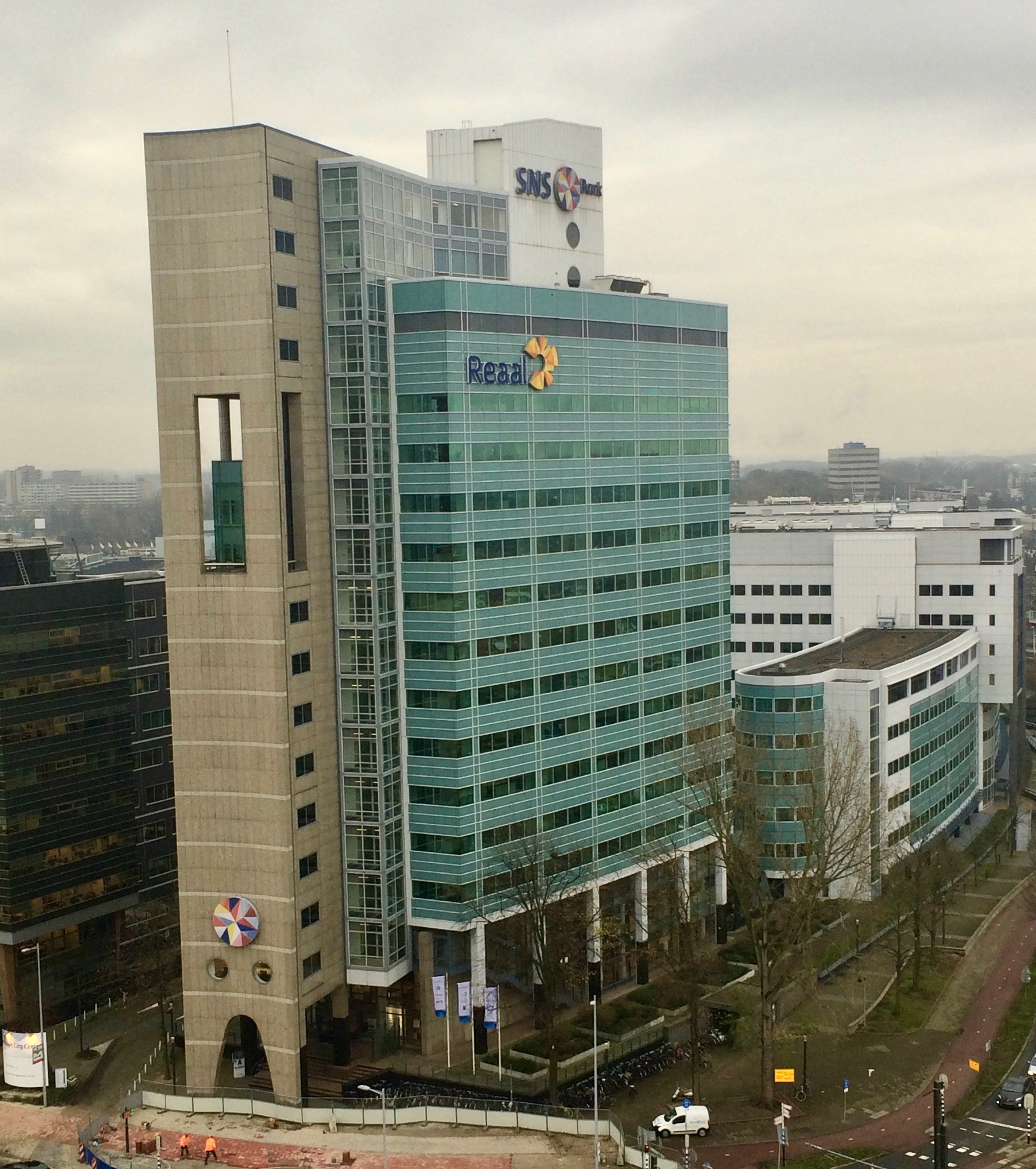
SNS REAAL headquarters in Utrecht (2015).

On 1 February 2013 the Dutch Minister of Finance, Jeroen Dijsselbloem, announced the decision to expropriate securities and assets of SNS REAAL and SNS Bank NV in connection with the stability of the financial system, thus bringing the bank under state control. The initial cost of the nationalisation was put at 3.7 billion euros. Unlike in many previous European bank bailouts, junior bondholders were not bailed out and lost their investment completely, although senior bondholders were still protected.

In December 2013, the Dutch government announced its intent to consolidate most of the banking activities of SNS Reaal under SNS Bank, and to separate the banking and insurance activities (approved by the Europese Commission earlier that month). This would allow re-privatisation of SNS Bank and Reaal as separate entities.

SNS Securities N.V. (originally founded in 1981, subsidiary of SNS Bank N.V.) was acquired by NIBC Bank in 2015.

=== De Volksbank ===
In September 2016 it was announced that the main banks under SNS REAAL have been consolidated under SNS Bank N.V. It would also rename to De Volksbank as of 1 January 2017.

=== VIVAT ===
In June 2014, SNS announced that the insurance arm of SNS REAAL would become Vivat Verzekeringen. The company also announced that SNS Asset Management would be renamed to Actiam and also become part of Vivat.

The insurance arm of SNS REAAL consisting of Reaal, Actiam, Zwitserleven, and Proteq (Reaal N.V.) was renamed in 2014 to Vivat N.V. In February 2015, it was announced that the firm would sell Vivat to the Chinese financial group Anbang in a deal worth €1.4 billion.

=== Propertize ===
In December 2013, SNS announced its real estate arm SNS Property Finance would continue under the name Propertize as separate entity.

In October 2015, the Minister of Finance announced that Propertize would be for sale starting in December 2015. By June 2016, a deal was made with Lone Star Funds and JPMorgan to buy Propertize for €895 million. The deal closed in September 2016.

== Subsidiaries ==
SNS REAAL has operated the following brands at different points in time.

Banking:

- SNS Bank, bank (part of De Volksbank).
- ASN Bank, bank (part of De Volksbank).
- BLG Wonen, bank (part of De Volksbank).
- RegioBank: intermediate bank (part of De Volksbank).

Insurance:

- DBV Hypotheken (via AXA).
- Winterthur Nederland (via AXA).
- Proteq, insurer with direct distribution channel (via Reaal).
- Route Mobiel: roadside assistance service (part of Vivat).
- Zwitserleven: pension insurance (part of Vivat).
- SNS Asset Management: asset for institutional investors (later Actiam).
- Actiam (part of Vivat).
- Proteq levensverzekeringen: life insurance (part of Vivat).
- SRLEV NV: holding company name of Reaal, also the trades as Europe Life, Extra Medium, Happy Service Insurance, Insurance Hooge Huys, Hooge Huys Virtual Workshop, and REAAL Virtual Workshop

Real estate:

- Bouwfonds Property Finance: financier property and holding company (later Propertize)

Other brands:

- SNS Securities: investment banking and securities brokerage (via SNS Bank, later part of NIBC Bank).

== Financial results ==
Year	Turnover	Net income	Balance sheet total	Employees
2011	▼€6,119,000	▲€87 million	▲€132,174,000	▼6928
2010	▼€7,068,000	▼ – €260 million	▼€127,713,000	▼7113
2009	▲€8,497,000	▲€17 million	▲€128,900,000	▼7520
2008	▲€5,137,000	▼ – €504 million	▲€125,359,000	▲7535
2007	▲€4,543,000	▲€465 million	▲€103,074,000	▲6713

== See also ==
- List of banks in the Netherlands
