= Bank Ten Cate & Cie =

Bank Ten Cate & Cie. N.V.
- Industry: Financial services
- Founded: 1881
- Headquarters: Amsterdam, Netherlands
- Website: www.banktencate.com

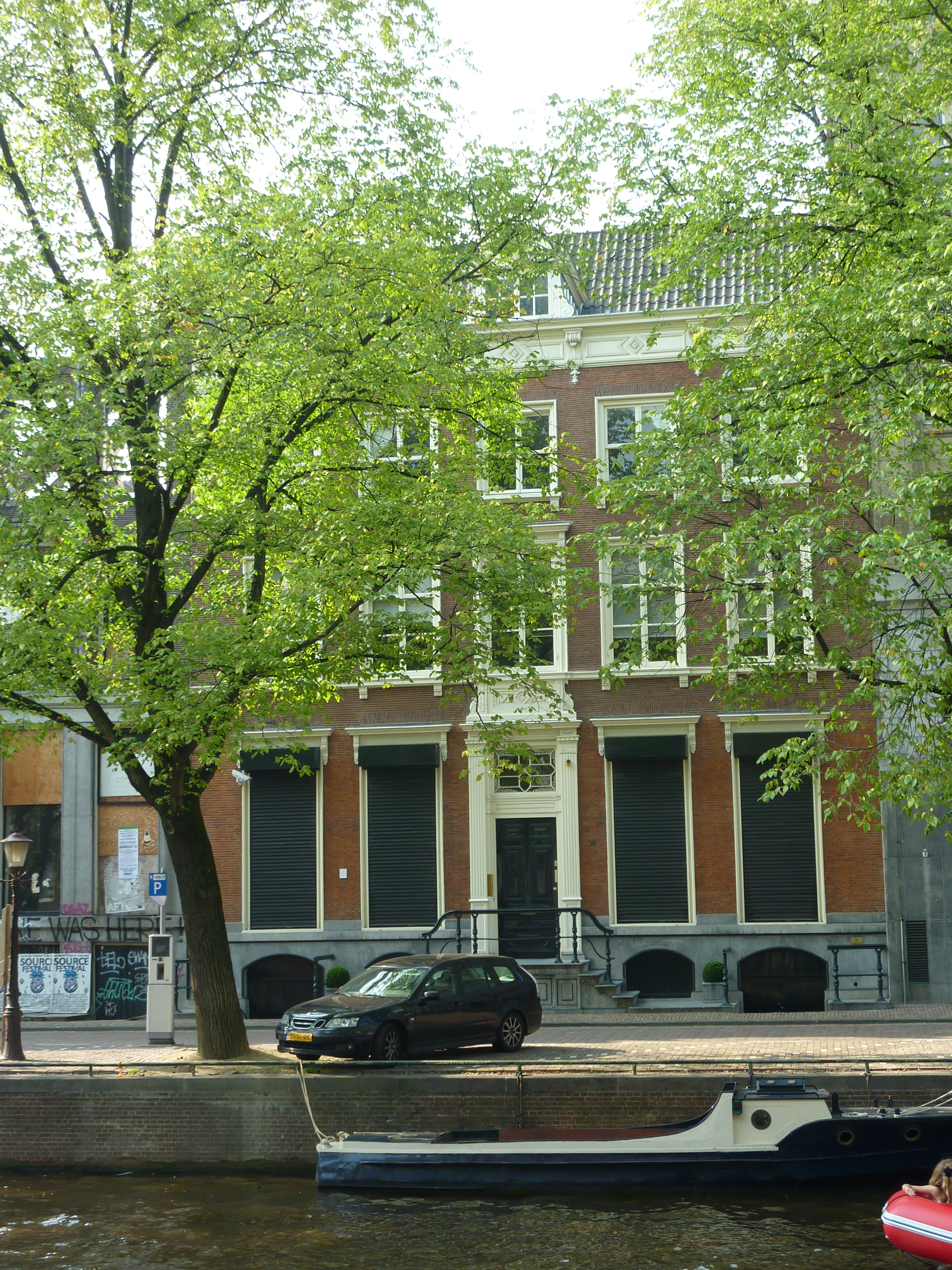
Bank Ten Cate & Cie in Amsterdam.

Bank Ten Cate & Cie. N.V. is a Dutch bank focused on private banking services and asset management.

== History ==
The bank was founded in 1881 by the family Ten Cate of the same textile factory in Twente. It has about 60 employees, the management, the private bankers, investment advisors, secretarial support and other support services (back office). It is the only Dutch bank that is still completely family-owned.

== Services ==
Bank Ten Cate focusses on asset management in a variety of forms. The type of administration depends on the needs of individual clients.

== See also ==
- List of banks in the Netherlands
