= Van der Hoop Bankiers =

Netherlands ex-bank

Van der Hoop Bankiers N.V. is a Dutch bank founded in 1895 currently in state of bankruptcy and put under supervision of court-ordered curators.

== History prior to 2005 ==
The bank was founded by Cornelis van der Hoop in Rotterdam in 1895, with several branches including in The Hague. Its headquarters moved to Amsterdam some time later, at the " Gouden Bocht " at Herengracht 469 in Amsterdam. Until 2003 the bank's name was van der Hoop Effektenbank NV and it was a relatively small, specialized bank whose account holders were mainly wealthy individuals who had often been clients there for a long time. The bank was completely dependent on the securities company for its income. The new name was part of developments to offer banking services for mortgages, savings and asset management to additional, less wealthy, customers. This development was not very successful. Among other things, an attempt was made to provide film financing. At the end of 2004, Van der Hoop Bankiers' balance sheet total was 403.6 million euros, and the bank had approximately 100 million euros in assets. The mortgage portfolio amounted to approximately 150 million euros.

== Events and bankruptcy in 2006 ==
On 9 December 2005 the bank was found by a Dutch court to be in a financial position that required attention. Its liquidity position was found to consist of €140 million in demands, while its credit facilities consisted of only €68 million. Also, the Netherlands central bank was concerned about whether the bank was solvent. Van der Hoop Bankiers was declared bankrupt by the same court on 16 December 2005, when the bank showed it had a negative balance of €9 million.

Earlier in 2005, the bank had settled a claim of €5.5 million with the Dutch Tax and Customs Administration (Belastingdienst) for not paying some of the corporation taxes on its daughter companies. This dated back to 2001. The bank had set up so-called cash companies with the objective of raising more income. Such companies were considered risky. Unusually, this activity was carried out entirely in the bank's own name (through its own trust company). A bank usually only mediates in such shares and they are not held in its own name, but, after taking tax advice, the bank took the unusual course of conducting this activity entirely in its own name (through its own trust company). As a result, the profit for 2004 had to be adjusted retrospectively to a loss.

On 8 June 2005, Van der Hoop's management informed the account holders by letter of the loss and announced a restructuring. A press release was also issued at the time. At the end of June 2005, it was announced that one-third of the 75 jobs at the bank would be cut, which attracted media attention. Takeover and merger discussions - including with project developer LSI and the Belgian Bank DeGroof - came to nothing. At the request of the Netherlands central bank, emergency regulations were applied on 9 December, freezing all bank accounts, after which bankruptcy was declared on 16 December. Rutger Jan Schimmelpenninck and HP de Haan were appointed as the two administrators and receivers. On 23 December 2005 they sent a letter to the account holders about the assets. Securities that were not in the name of the bank might still be available. The distribution lists, bankruptcy reports and other legally relevant documents are still available on the website of the law firm Houthoff of the former trustee.

The Hope Loss Foundation was established on 13 February 2006 as an advocate for the account holders after the bankruptcy. The board of this foundation consisted of 4 account holders at the bank and meetings were held in 2006. In the end, a lawsuit was brought by the account holders about whether DNB could recover the amounts that it was required to pay out to private account holders and small businesses under the Deposit Guarantee Scheme from the bankruptcy estate. In fact, DNB had made a mistake on this point during a creditors' meeting. The account holders group won the lawsuit; a substantive procedure was never initiated by DNB.

Under the Deposit Guarantee Scheme (depositogarantiestelsel) of the Netherlands central bank, account holders were eligible for compensation up to a maximum of €20,000, and in fact received twice this protection from the scheme.

Ultimately, all private savers and account holders were fully repaid their credit from the proceeds of the bankruptcy estate. However, the bank's shareholders lost their deposits permanently.

== See also ==
- List of banks in the Netherlands

== Sources ==
- This article is based entirely or partially on its equivalent on Dutch Wikipedia.
