= List of banks in the Netherlands =

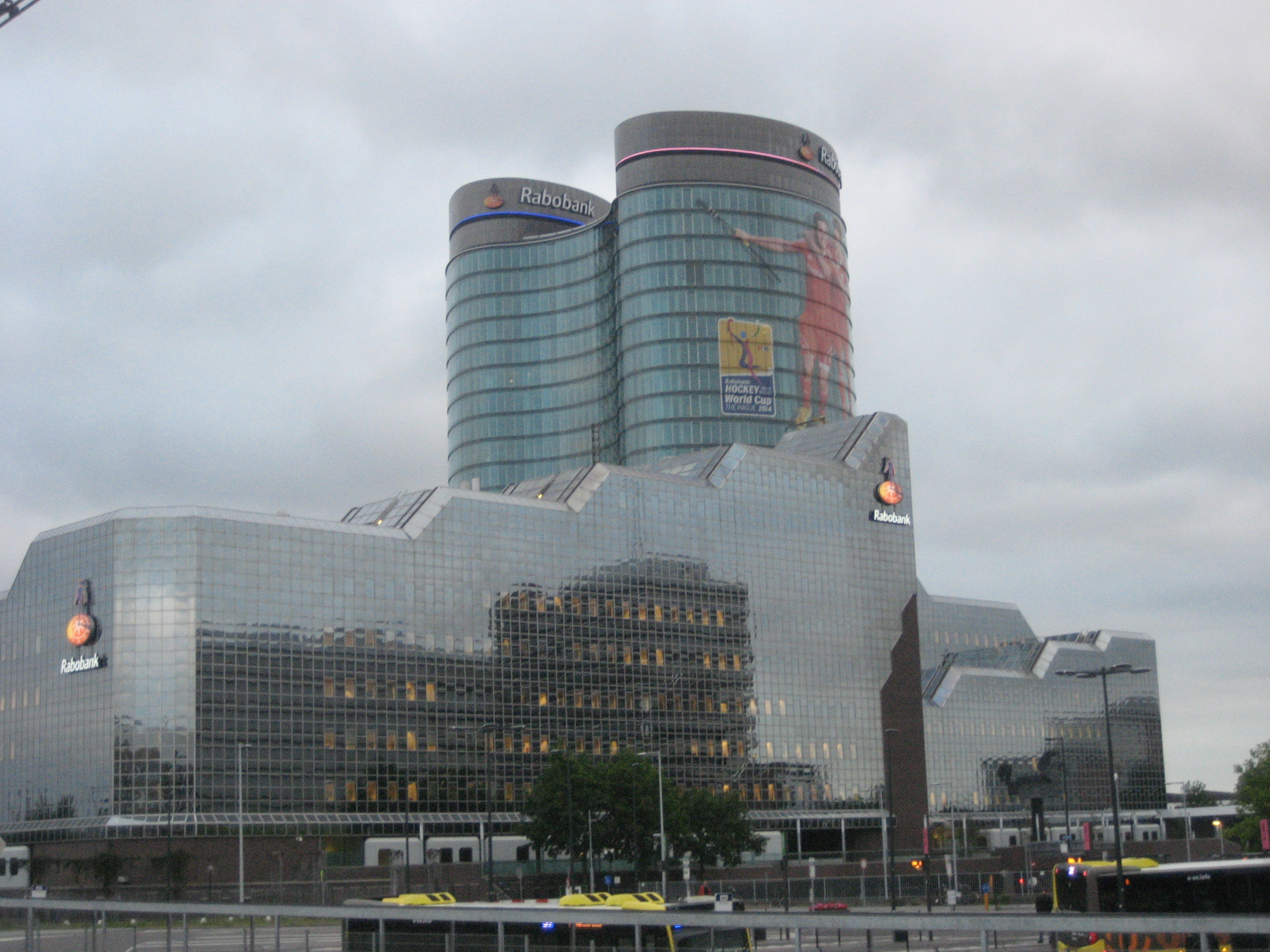
Rabobank head office complex, Utrecht

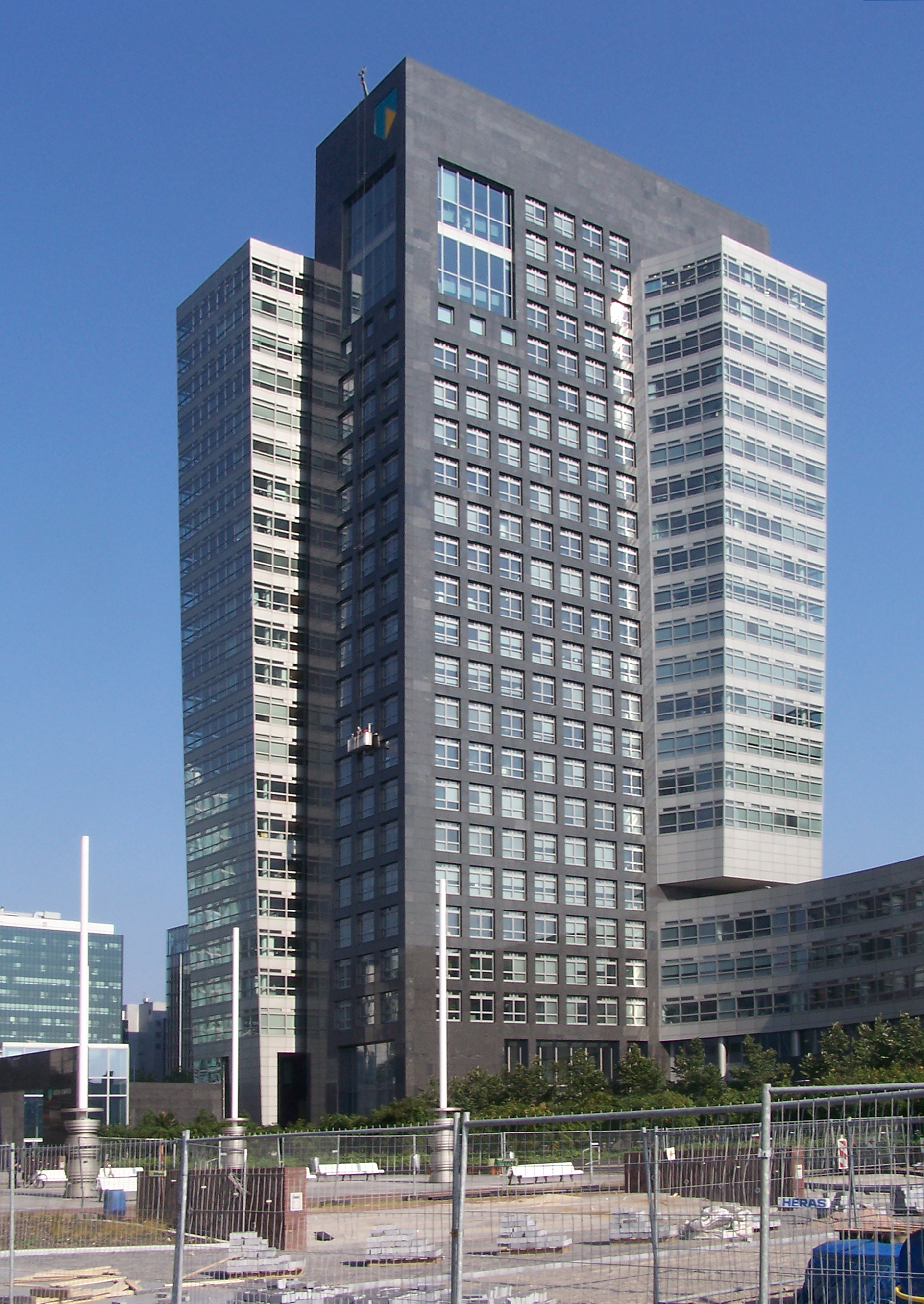
ABN AMRO head office, Amsterdam

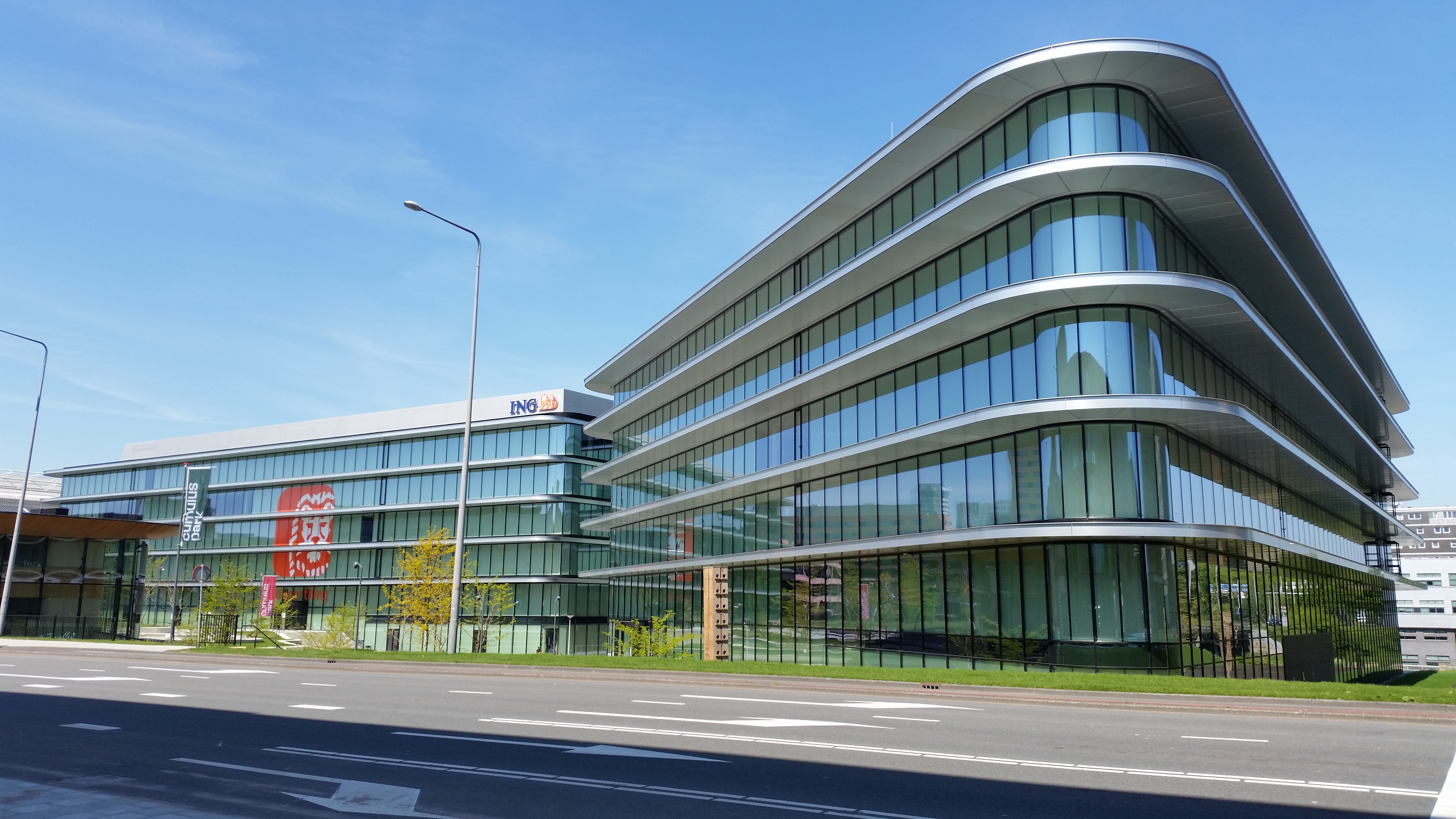
ING head office, Amsterdam

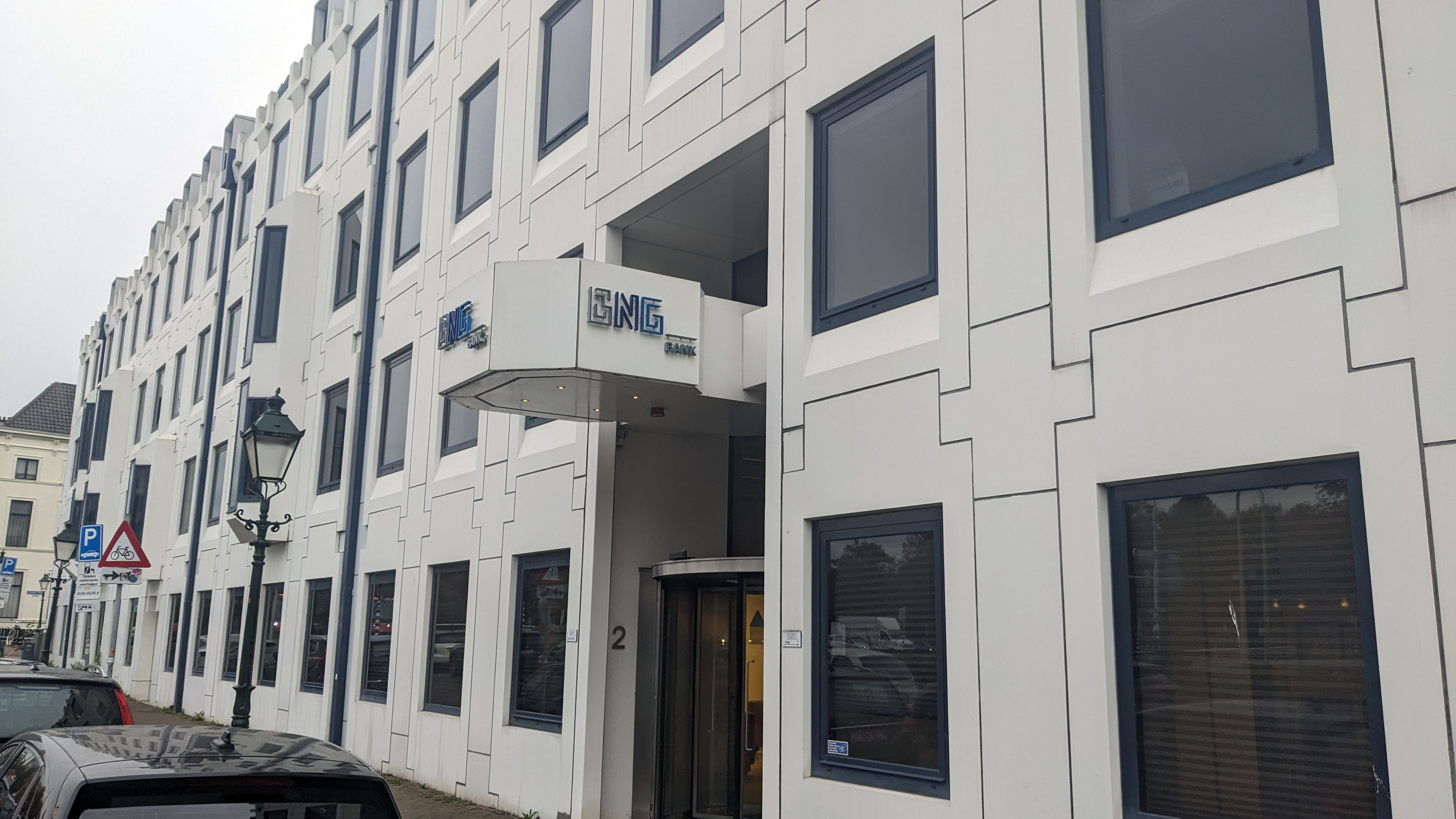
BNG head office, The Hague

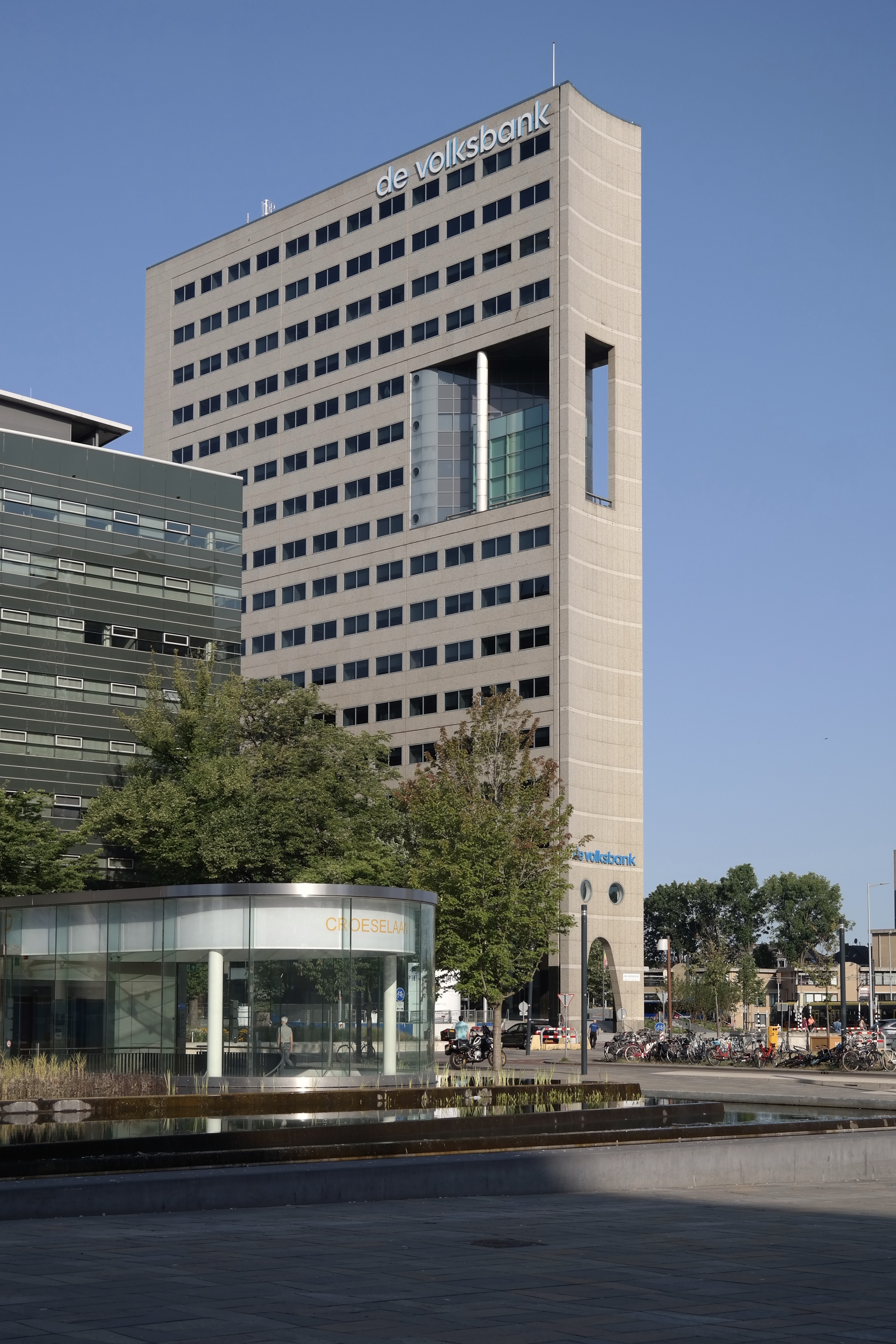
Hojel City Center building, head office of ASN Bank, Utrecht

The following list of banks in the Netherlands is to be understood within the framework of the European single market and European banking union, which means that the Netherlands' banking system is more open to cross-border banking operations than peers outside of the EU.

== Policy framework ==
European banking supervision distinguishes between significant institutions (SIs) and less significant institutions (LSIs), with SI/LSI designations updated regularly by the European Central Bank (ECB). Significant institutions are directly supervised by the ECB using joint supervisory teams that involve the national competent authorities (NCAs) of individual participating countries. Less significant institutions are supervised by the relevant NCA on a day-to-day basis, under the supervisory oversight of the ECB. In the Dutch case, the NCA is De Nederlandsche Bank.

== Significant institutions ==
As of 1 September 2025, the list of supervised institutions maintained by the ECB included the following seven Dutch banking groups as SIs, with names as indicated by the ECB for each group's consolidating entity. Of these, ING has been consistently designated as Global systemically important bank (G-SIB) by the Financial Stability Board, including in its update of November 2025.

- ABN AMRO Bank NV
- ASN Bank NV
- BNG Bank NV
- ING Groep NV
- Nederlandse Waterschapsbank NV
- Coöperatieve Rabobank UA
- RBS Holdings NV, one of two intermediate parent undertakings of NatWest Group in the EU

A study published in 2024 assessed that the bank with most aggregate assets in the Netherlands (as opposed to total consolidated assets) as of end-2023 was Rabobank at €593 billion, followed by ABN AMRO (€378 billion), ING (€293 billion), BNG (€116 billion), Waterschapsbank (€76 billion), SNS / de Volksbank (now ASN, €71 billion), and RBS Holdings (€28 billion). The Netherlands is also home to subsidiaries of three other euro-area significant institutions, namely BAWAG, BBVA, and Société Générale.

Separately, Promontoria 19 Coöperatie UA, a Dutch-based holding entity, is designated by the ECB as the consolidated entity of a French SI that includes CCF.

== Less significant institutions ==
As of 1 September 2025, the ECB's list of supervised institutions included 29 Dutch LSIs.

=== High-impact LSIs ===
Of these, five were designated by the ECB as "high-impact" on the basis of several criteria including size:

- Achmea Bank NV
- Nationale-Nederlanden Bank NV, subsidiary of NN Group
- NIBC Bank NV
- Triodos Bank NV
- Van Lanschot Kempen NV

=== Other Dutch LSIs ===
The other 12 domestic Dutch LSIs were:

- Adyen NV, a payment service provider
- Bank Ten Cate & Cie. NV
- Oreades Holding BV, owner of Brand New Day Group
  - Brand New Day Houdstermaatschappij NV, an intermediate holding entity
  - Brand New Day Bank NV
- bunq Holding BV, holding entity of bunq
  - bunq BV
- CEG NV, holding entity of Nexent Bank
  - Nexent Bank NV
- HCBG Holding BV, part-owner of DHB Bank
  - DHB Bank NV
- Nederlandse Financierings-Maatschappij voor Ontwikkelingslanden NV (FMO), a public development bank

=== Non-euro-area-controlled LSIs ===
Based on the same ECB list, 12 Dutch LSIs (3 branches and 9 subsidiaries) were affiliates of financial groups based outside the euro area:

- (Turkey) Anadolubank Nederland NV, subsidiary of Anadolubank
- (British Virgin Islands) Citco Bank Nederland NV, subsidiary of Citco
- (United Kingdom) ClearBank Europe NV, subsidiary of ClearBank
- Commonwealth Bank of Australia (Europe) NV, subsidiary of Commonwealth Bank
- (Sweden) Dutch branch of Hoist Finance AB
- (Japan) Mizuho Bank Europe NV, subsidiary of Mizuho Financial Group
- (Japan) MUFG Bank (Europe) NV, subsidiary of MUFG
  - MUFG Securities (Europe) NV, subsidiary of MUFG
- (Japan) Norinchukin Europe NV, subsidiary of Norinchukin Bank
- (Denmark) Dutch branch of Saxo Bank A/S
- (Sweden) Dutch branch of Svenska Handelsbanken AB (publ)
- (Turkey) Yapi Kredi Bank Nederland NV, subsidiary of Yapı Kredi

== Third-country branches ==
As of 13 October 2025, the following two banking groups established outside the European Economic Area had branches in the Netherlands:

- (Korea) KEB Hana Bank
- (Taiwan) Mega International Commercial Bank

== Credit unions ==
The Netherlands is one of six euro-area countries with credit unions, together with Croatia, Estonia, Ireland, Latvia, and Lithuania. Dutch credit unions are small cooperative credit institutions outside the scope of the EU Capital Requirements Directives (CRD), and thus regulated and supervised under national law. At end-2023, there were 30 such Dutch credit unions with total assets of ca. €43 million (US$47 million).

== Other institutions ==
De Nederlandsche Bank and Stadsbank van Lening, Amsterdam are public credit institutions that do not hold a banking license under EU law. Similarly, the Nederlandse Investeringsbank voor Ontwikkelingslanden (NIO), Noordelijke Ontwikkelingsmaatschappij (NOM), Industriebank Limburgs Instituut voor Ontwikkeling en Financiering (LIOF), and Overijsselse Ontwikkelingsmaatschappij are outside the scope of CRD.

== Defunct banks ==
A number of former Dutch banks, defined as having been headquartered in the present-day territory of the Netherlands or in then-Dutch colonies, are documented on Wikipedia. They are listed below in chronological order of establishment.

- Bank van Lening, Haarlem (13C-1957)
- Stadsleenbank Delft (1287-1923)
- Clifford family bank (16C-18C)
- Bank of Amsterdam (1609-1819)
- Andries Pels & Sons (1707–1774)
- Hope & Co. (1720-1962)
- Bank Vlaer & Kol (1748-1977)
- Nachenius Tjeenk (1790-2009)
- Scheurleer & Zoonen (1804-1932)
- Lissa & Kann (1805-1940)
- Wed. Knox en Dortland (1805-1952)
- Leidsche Spaarbank (1818-1977)
- Nutsspaarbank 's-Gravenhage (1818-1992)
- Nutsspaarbank Nijmegen (1819-1833)
- N.V. Berger's Bank (1819-1932)
- Teixeira de Mattos Bank (1822-1966)
- Nederlandsche Handel-Maatschappij (1824-1964)
- Bank of Java (1828-1951)
- Twentsche Bank (1841-1964)
- Spaarbank voor de stad Amsterdam (1848-1979)
- Nederlandsch-Indische Escompto Maatschappij (1857-1960)
- Lippmann, Rosenthal & Co. (1859-1941)
- Nederlandsch-Indische Handelsbank (1863-1960)
- Rotterdamsche Bank (1863-1964)
- Furnée & Co. (1867-1973)
- Amsterdamsche Bank (1871-1964)
- Koloniale Bank (1881-1970)
- Rijkspostspaarbank (1881-1986)
- Theodoor Gilissen Bankiers (1881-2017)
- Kol & Co (1883-1972)
- Noordbrabantsche Bank (1883-1902)
- De Bas & Co (1884-1941)
- Van Mierlo en Zoon (1884-1952)
- Schill & Capadose (1886-1952)
- Nijmeegsche Bankvereeniging Van Engelenburg & Schippers (1887-1942)
- Nederlandsche Bank en Credietvereeniging voor Zuid-Afrika (1888-1951), continued in South Africa as Nedbank
- Tilburgsche Hypotheekbank (1890-1983)
- Incasso Bank (1891-1956)
- De Maas- en Waalsche Bank Kneppers & Co. (1892-1925)
- Geldersche Bank (1895-1927)
- Van der Hoop Bankiers (1895-2005)
- Javasche Hypotheekbank (1896-1939)
- Buitenlandsche Bankvereeniging (1897-1944)
- Delftsche Bank (1897-1903)
- Emissie-Bank (1898-1904)
- Residentiebank (1898-1927)
- Meijerijsche Bank (1899-1907)
- Graafschapsche Bank (1900-1905)
- Amersfoortsche Bank (1902-1910)
- Haagsche Commissie Bank (1903-1951)
- Leendertz en Co. en Carbasius Bank (1905-1920)
- Schretlen & Co (1911-2014)
- Bataafsche Credietbank (1913-1927)
- Friesland Bank (1913-2013)
- Zeeuwsche Bank (1913-1925)
- Hollandsche Bank-Unie (1914-2010)
- Bank voor Handel en Scheepvaart (1916-1945)
- Staalbankiers (1916-1994)
- Bataafsche Bank (1917-1925)
- Gemeentegiro Amsterdam (1917-1986)
- Postcheque- en Girodienst (1918-1977)
- Noord-Hollandsche Bank (1919-1924)
- Amstelbank (1921-1947)
- Burgers Bank (1922-1932)
- Hugo Kaufmann & Co.'s Bank (1924-1948)
- Slavenburg's Bank (1925-1983)
- Nederlandsche Middenstandsbank (1927-1989)
- Vrouwenbank (1928-1971)
- Liro Bank (1941-1945)
- Rijnsche Handelsbank (1941-1945)
- Landelijke Hypotheekbank (1943-1968)
- Algemene Bank Nederland (1964-1991)
- AMRO Bank (1964-1991)
- Indonesische Overzeese Bank (1965-2008)
- BdB Bank (1970-1991)
- DSB Bank (1975-2009)
- Amsterdam-American Bank (1978-1981)
- Centrumbank (1979-1983)
- VSB Groep (1979-1990)
- Postbank N.V. (1986-1991)
- NMB Postbank Groep (1989-1991)
- Fortis Bank Nederland (1990-2010)
- Amsterdam Trade Bank (1994-2022)
- SNS Reaal (1997-2015)
- Alex Bank (1999-2018)
- GE Artesia Bank (2006-2015)
- NEWbank (2007-2010)

== See also ==
- List of banks in the euro area
- List of banks in Europe
