= De Volksbank =

Bank in the Netherlands

De Volksbank N.V.
- Industry: Banking
- Founded: 1817
- Headquarters: Utrecht, Netherlands
- Products: Banking; Insurance
- Net income: €116 million (2009)
- Total assets: €80 billion
- Number of employees: 3000
- Parent: NL Financial Investments (state-owned)

De Volksbank (Dutch pronunciation: [də ˈvɔlksbɑŋk], lit. 'The People's Bank') is a Dutch retail bank offering financial products to both companies and individuals. Prior to a 2017 restructuring, it was called SNS Bank, which remains its major brand name. It became a subsidiary of SNS Reaal in 1997 when the holding company bought the insurance company Reaal. The bank and its parent were rescued by the Dutch government in 2013 and have been state owned since then. In 2016, SNS Bank was the fourth-largest bank in the Netherlands in terms of total assets.

De Volksbank has been designated as a Significant Institution since the entry into force of European Banking Supervision in late 2014, and as a consequence is directly supervised by the European Central Bank.

== History ==
The history of the bank goes back to 1817, when the first savings bank (Dutch: spaarbank) in the Netherlands was established as Nutsspaarbank. The saving bank movement was part of a campaign to encourage individual citizens to save for their future. The savings banks used these funds to provide mortgages to individuals who would otherwise not have the ability to buy their own house, much like the building society movement in the UK.

In 1987 a merger with several regional banks, including Gelders-Utrechtse Spaarbank en Spaarbank Limburg, formed SNS Bank. SNS is an abbreviation for Samenwerkende Nederlandse Spaarbanken (English: "Co-operating Dutch savings banks"). The holding was called Sanes Holding N.V.

The second half of the 20th century saw a big consolidation of spaarbanks in the Netherlands. Some joined SBS Bank, while others joined VSB (Dutch: Verenigde Spaarbank, English: United Savings Bank), which later became part of Fortis. In 1990, following several more mergers, SNS Bank N.V. and its holding company SNS Groep N.V. were formed.

In 1997, SNS Groep N.V. and insurer REAAL Group N.V. merged into SNS REAAL N.V.

The holding company was listed on the Euronext stock exchange in Amsterdam on 18 May 2006. On 4 December 2006 it was announced that SNS REAAL would purchase RegioBank from ING Bank in a €50M deal.

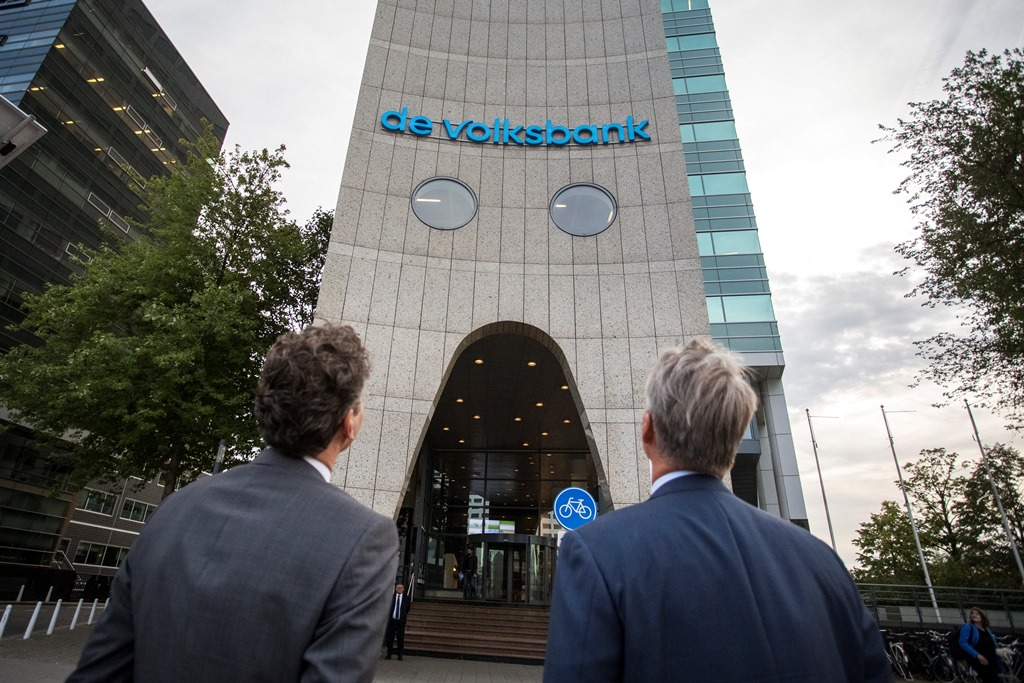
CEO Maurice Oostendorp and Dutch minister of Finance Jeroen Dijsselbloem reveal the new logo at the Utrecht headquarters (September 2016).

On 1 February 2013 SNS Bank and its parent SNS REAAL were nationalized by the Dutch government to save it from default. Investors were expropriated as a result of the nationalization and originally, the Ministry of Finance did not want to provide any compensation at all, but in February 2021, after years of legal proceedings, a Dutch court ruled that the government must pay 804 million euros plus interest to them.

In September 2016 it was announced that SNS Bank would be called De Volksbank as of 1 January 2017. De Volksbank has a single banking permit and continues to operate under multiple brand names, including SNS Bank, ASN Bank, BLG Wonen and RegioBank.

== See also ==
- SNS REAAL
