= DHB Bank =

Dutch commercial bank

DHB Bank N.V.
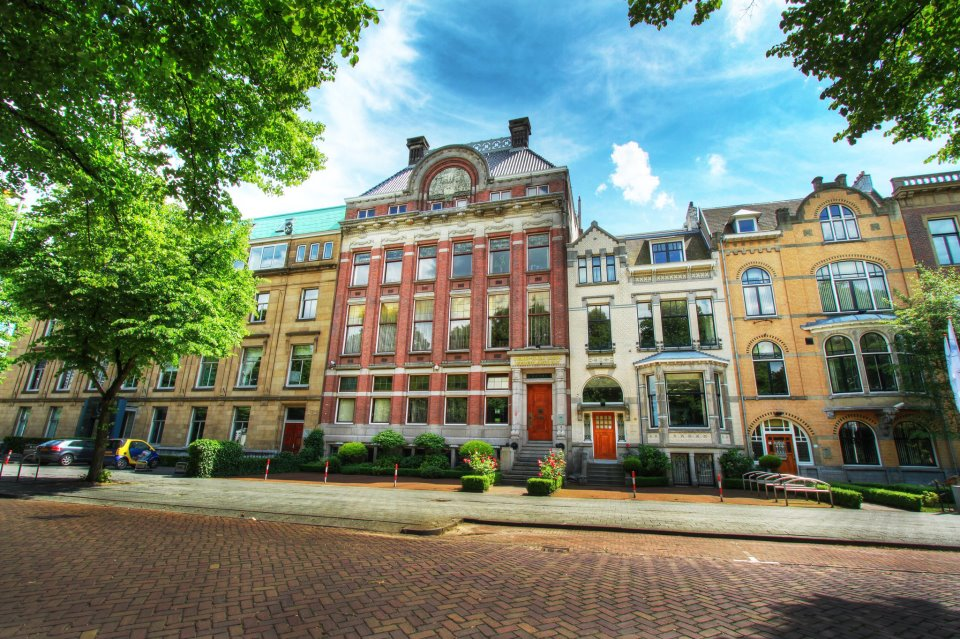
- Company type: Naamloze vennootschap (public company)
- Industry: Financial services
- Founded: 1992
- Headquarters: Rotterdam, Netherlands
- Products: Retail Banking, Commercial Banking,
- Owner: HCBG Holding B.V. (70%); Turkey Halkbank (30%)
- Number of employees: 130
- Website: www.dhbbank.com

DHB Bank N.V. is a Dutch commercial bank headquartered in Rotterdam. The bank is jointly owned by Turkish Halkbank and HCBG Holding BV. The bank conducts its activities through locations in the Netherlands, Belgium, Germany and Turkey.

== History ==
DHB Bank was established as a commercial bank under Dutch law on 30 December 1992. Starting its operations with NLG 17.8 million equity (EUR equivalent 8.1 million) and NLG 18.2 million asset size (EUR equivalent 8.3 million), the bank grew to a become a fully fledged commercial bank with an equity of EUR 241.8 million and asset size of 1,826.9 million at the end of 2017. With its head office in Rotterdam, the Netherlands, DHB Bank has a main branch in Düsseldorf, a main branch in Brussels (and 3 sub-branches in Liege, Antwerp and Charleroi) and a representative office in Istanbul.

On 1 August 2003 the bank acquired Disbank's Dutch subsidiary Dısbank Nederland. In the second half of 2008, DHB Bank acquired a 66.65% stake in Export & Credit Bank Inc, Skopje (EC Bank), which was sold to Turkey Halkbank in the second quarter of 2011.

== Activities ==
DHB Bank's activities are anchored in traditional commercial banking, based primarily on retail funding (and wholesale funding to a certain extent) and mainly wholesale asset generation (again relatively small retail asset generation). DHB Bank's business model and revenue stream fully rely on real banking transactions, and there is no reliance on any kind of speculative income. Therefore, the bank tries to minimize the market risk by avoiding FX position or interest rate position, and derivative transactions are mainly done for assets and liabilities hedging purposes. The bank conducts its activities through the executional authorities and responsibilities of the Managing Board (MB), under the supervision of the Supervisory Board (SB), and cascades these down throughout the organization founded on different building blocks (i.e. departments and functions). DHB Bank's retail operations consist of retail deposits and consumer loans. Retail deposits are collected from Germany and the Netherlands via Internet and call centre channels.

On the assets side, wholesale banking is the foremost revenue generation source for DHB Bank. The bank's wholesale asset generation activities are centralized at the head office in Rotterdam. Wholesale asset generation activities comprise primarily placements in the form of corporate loans, syndications, to an extent bilateral loan to banks. Geographical diversity is an essential feature of DHB Bank's activities on the asset side with exposures primarily in the European Economic Area (EEA).

== See also ==
- List of banks in the Netherlands
