= Amstelbank =

Amstelbank was a bank of the Netherlands founded in 1921, and liquidated in 1947. Some archives related to it are held at the Centraal Archief Nederlandsche Bank (Central Archives of the Nederlandsche Bank).

Essays on the Great Depression by Ben S. Bernanke (ISBN 0-691-01698-4) states that Amstelbank failed because of its ties to the Creditanstalt.

== 1941 lawsuit ==
See "Conflict of Laws: Refugee Government Property Conservation Decrees in the Courts of the United States, Robert D. Ulrich, Michigan Law Review, Vol. 41, No. 4 (Feb., 1943), pp. 706–713" for a discussion of the U.S. court case Amstelbank, N. V. v. Guaranty Trust Co. of N. Y., N. Y. L. J., Nov. 29, 1941, p. 1728, col. 6, 7 (Sup. Ct.).

== See also ==
- List of banks in the Netherlands
