= ASN Bank =

Bank in the Netherlands

- Industry: Financial services
- Founded: 1960
- Headquarters: Utrecht, Netherlands
- Revenue: €3.892 billion (2006)
- Net income: €6.8 million (2006)
- Total assets: €75,685 billion (2025)
- Parent: ASN Bank
- Website: www.asnbank.nl

ASN Bank is a Dutch bank, now a brand name for some consumer banking operations by de Volksbank. ASN focusses on socially responsible and sustainable investments.

ASN Bank was founded on May 1, 1960, by the precursor of the union of Federatie Nederlandse Vakbeweging (Federation Dutch Labour Union) (FNV), NVV and the insurance company de Centrale (now Reaal insurances). Until the 1990s it was possible to open an ASN savings account through the Postbank, which were known as 'vakbondsspaarrekeningen' (union savings accounts).

ASN Bank is currently the second largest sustainability-driven bank in the Netherlands, and was elected as the second most climate-friendly bank in the Netherlands (in both instances behind Triodos Bank).

ASN Bank has experienced rapid growth in recent years, in terms of the number of customers, in terms of assets entrusted to the bank, etc. Net profit has risen sharply since 2009, mainly due to the higher interest margin, the difference in interest on the borrowed and lent money. In the period from 2009 to 2013, ASN Bank's contribution to social partners and the ASN Foundation increased from 0.6 million euros to 2.6 million.

== See also ==
- List of banks in the euro area
- List of banks in the Netherlands
