= Scheurleer & Zoonen =

Dutch banking company

Scheurleer & Zoonen was a company that was established at Wagenstraat-Spuistraat, the Hague, Netherlands in 1804 by Willem Scheurleer. Willem traded in precious metals and during the course of the 19th century and the Scheurleer & Zoonen Bank grew in size and respectability, eventually having in excess of 140 employees.

In 1880 Scheurleer & Zoonen became the official bankers to the Crown and counted the wealthiest members of Hague society among their clients. The bank opened their second branch in Scheveningen in 1881, first on Keizerstraat, later on Prins Willemstraat and in 1915 Scheurleer & Zoonen gained admission to the Amsterdam Stock Exchange.

Finally, on the 11 April 1932, with an overreached credit loan after the First World War and problems in the market gardening and fishery sectors, Scheurleer & Zoonen closed down. The general economic malaise of the depression years proved too great for Scheurleer & Zoonen and the remaining healthy sections were taken over by the Incasso-Bank. Incasso-Bank in turn was taken over by the Amsterdamsche Bank, a predecessor of ABN AMRO.

== See also ==
- List of banks in the Netherlands
