= Nederlandsch-Indische Handelsbank =

Dutch bank

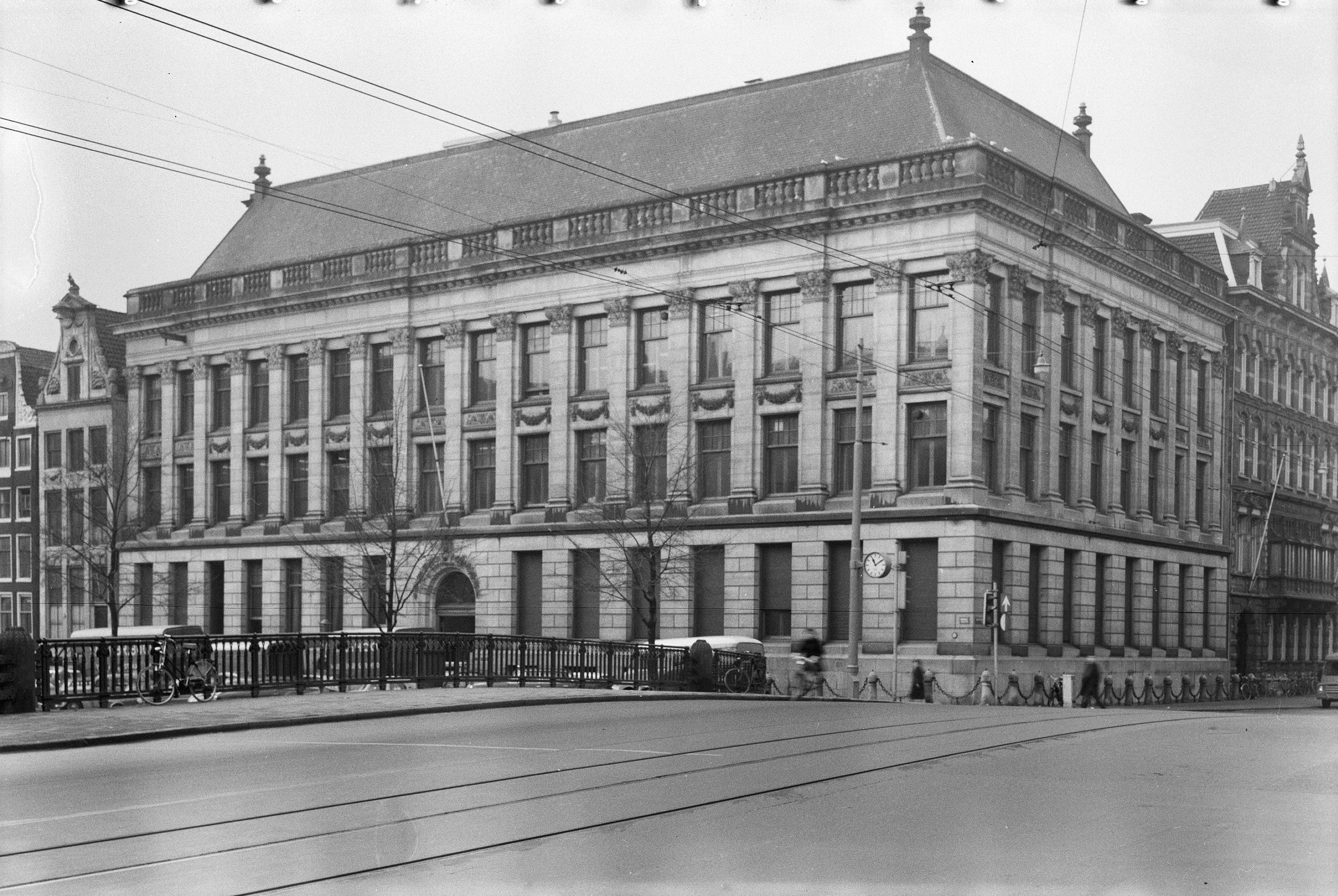
- Singel 250, former headquarters of NIHB in Amsterdam erected 1910-1912
- Industry: Financial services
- Founded: 1863
- Defunct: 1960
- Fate: part nationalized and part acquired
- Successor: Ultimate successors Bank Mandiri and ABN AMRO
- Headquarters: Amsterdam, Netherlands
- Products: Commercial banking and Retail banking

The Nederlandsch-Indische Handelsbank (NIHB, lit. 'Dutch [East] Indies Trade Bank') was a Dutch bank established in 1863 to finance trade between the Netherlands and the Dutch East Indies. During most of the colonial period, it was the second-largest of the “big three” commercial banks, behind the Netherlands Trading Company and ahead of the Nederlandsch-Indische Escompto Maatschappij, that dominated the Dutch East Indies’ financial system alongside the note-issuing Bank of Java.

In 1950 following Indonesian independence, the bank was renamed the Nationale Handelsbank (NHB, lit. 'National Trade Bank'). In 1959, its Indonesian activities were nationalized, and later contributed to the formation of the state-owned Bank Mandiri in 1998. In 1960, the NHB's remaining activities were acquired by the Rotterdamsche Bank, and were subsequently involved in the series of mergers that created ABN AMRO.

== Nederlandsch-Indische Handelsbank ==
In 1863, the Nederlandsch-Indische Handelsbank was established in order to finance and deal with trade between the Netherlands and the Dutch East Indies. The bank's head office was located in Amsterdam, unlike the Bank of Java whose head office was in Batavia. In turn, the NIHB's local branches within the Dutch colony reported to the main office in Batavia.

Between 1901 and 1950, Netherlands India Commercial Bank opened and closed various branches in third countries. In 1901 it opened a branch in Singapore, which played a key role in Dutch East Indies trade. The bank also established a branch in Hong Kong in 1906, which before World War I was a major transshipment point for raw sugar going from the Dutch East Indies to refineries in Britain. In 1920 the bank opened branches in Bombay, Calcutta, Shanghai, and Kobe to aid in cotton trading with Japan. From 1921 to 1923 branches were opened in the Japanese prefectures of Tokyo and Yokohama. Additional branches were also opened in the Chinese provinces of Amoy and Swatow. Although, in 1924 the branch in Yokohama closed after the 1923 Great Kantō earthquake and the Chinese branch in Swatow closed after operating for only a few years. The bank continued expanding in the 1930 and 1940s though. In 1938 a new branch was opened in Manila and in 1948 it established a branch in Bangkok to aid with the rice, tea, shellac trades. After 1949 the branches in China closed after the defeat of the Kuomintang government.

Under the Japanese occupation of the Dutch East Indies during World War II, the occupation authorities first closed all Dutch and other Western banks in March 1942, starting with the Bank of Java, and sequestered them to seize as much as possible of their assets. Among the three largest commercial banks, the Japanese authorities determined that the Netherlands Trading Company had assets of more than 280 million Dutch guilders, the NIHB had 158 million, and the Nederlandsch-Indische Escompto Maatschappij had 99 million. Of these, the Japanese occupiers were able to seize 27 million guilders in total. The banks could only reopen after the surrender of Japan in the late summer of 1945.

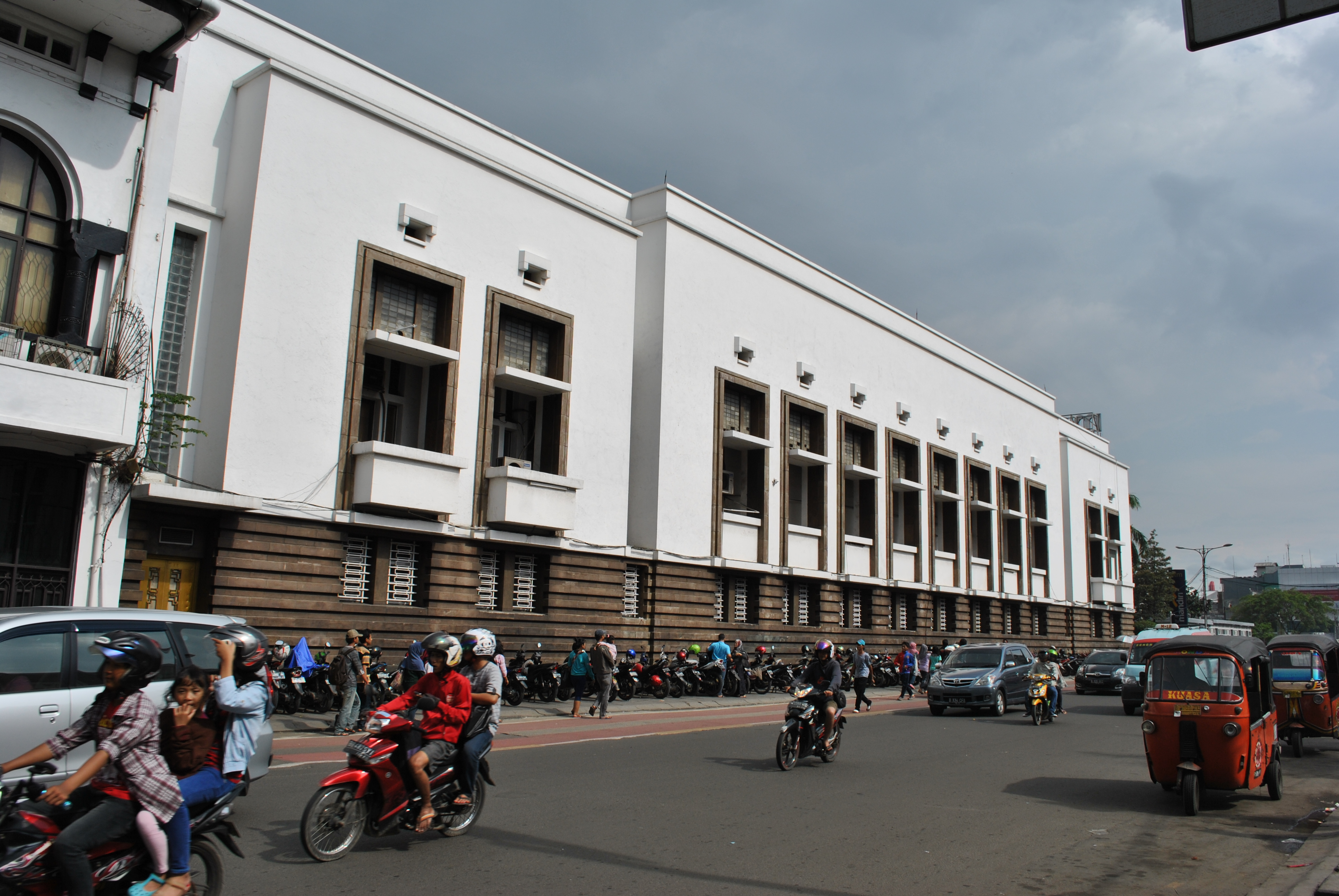
Main office building in Batavia designed by J.F.L. Blankenberg and Wolff Schoemaker, now Bank Mandiri Jakarta Kota

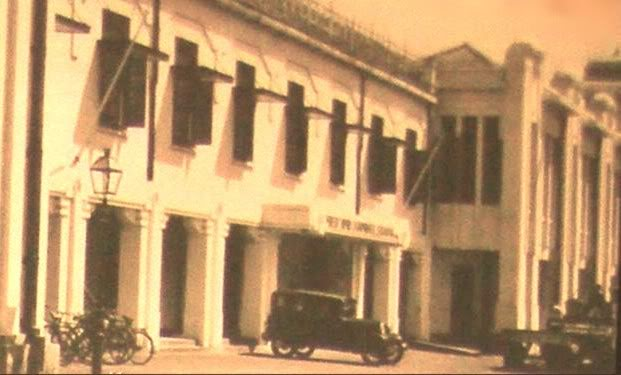
Another branch in Batavia, early 20th century

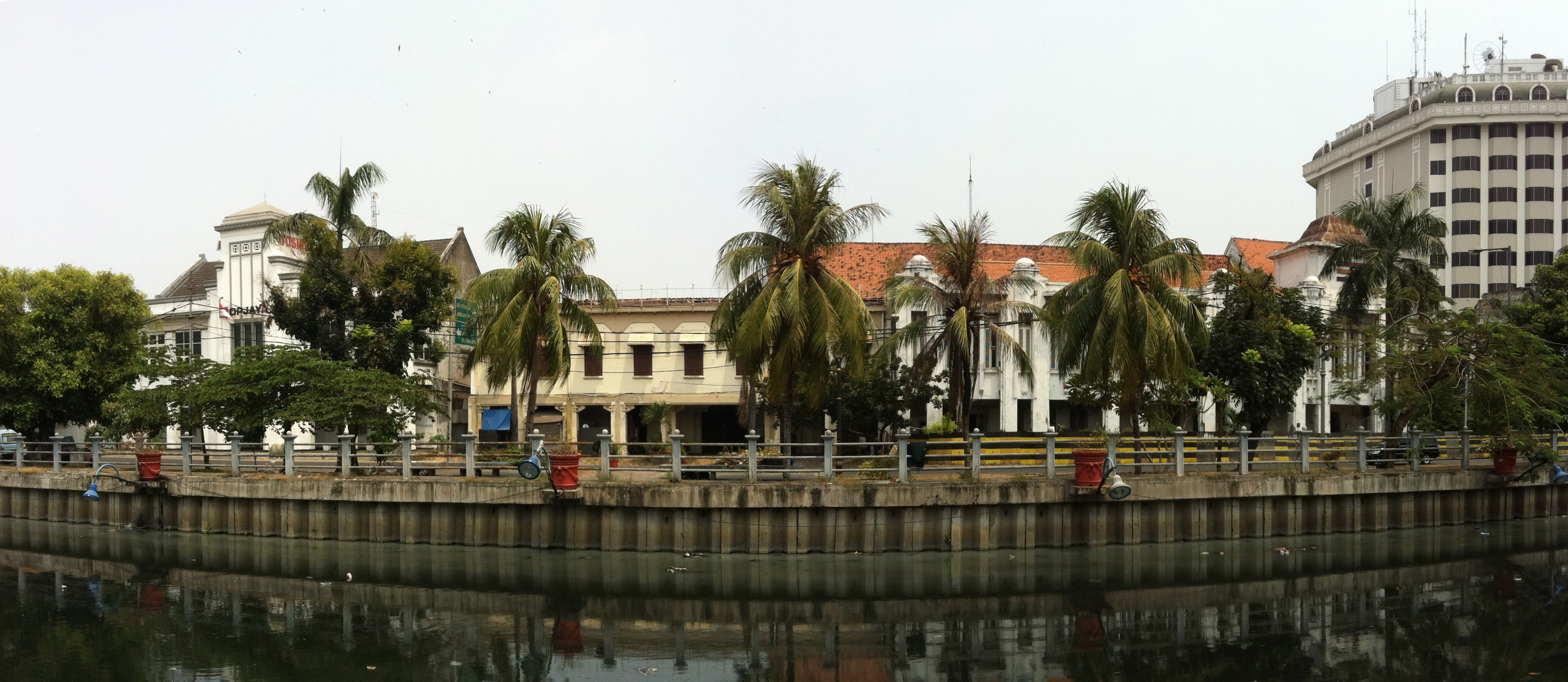
Same building (center) in 2011

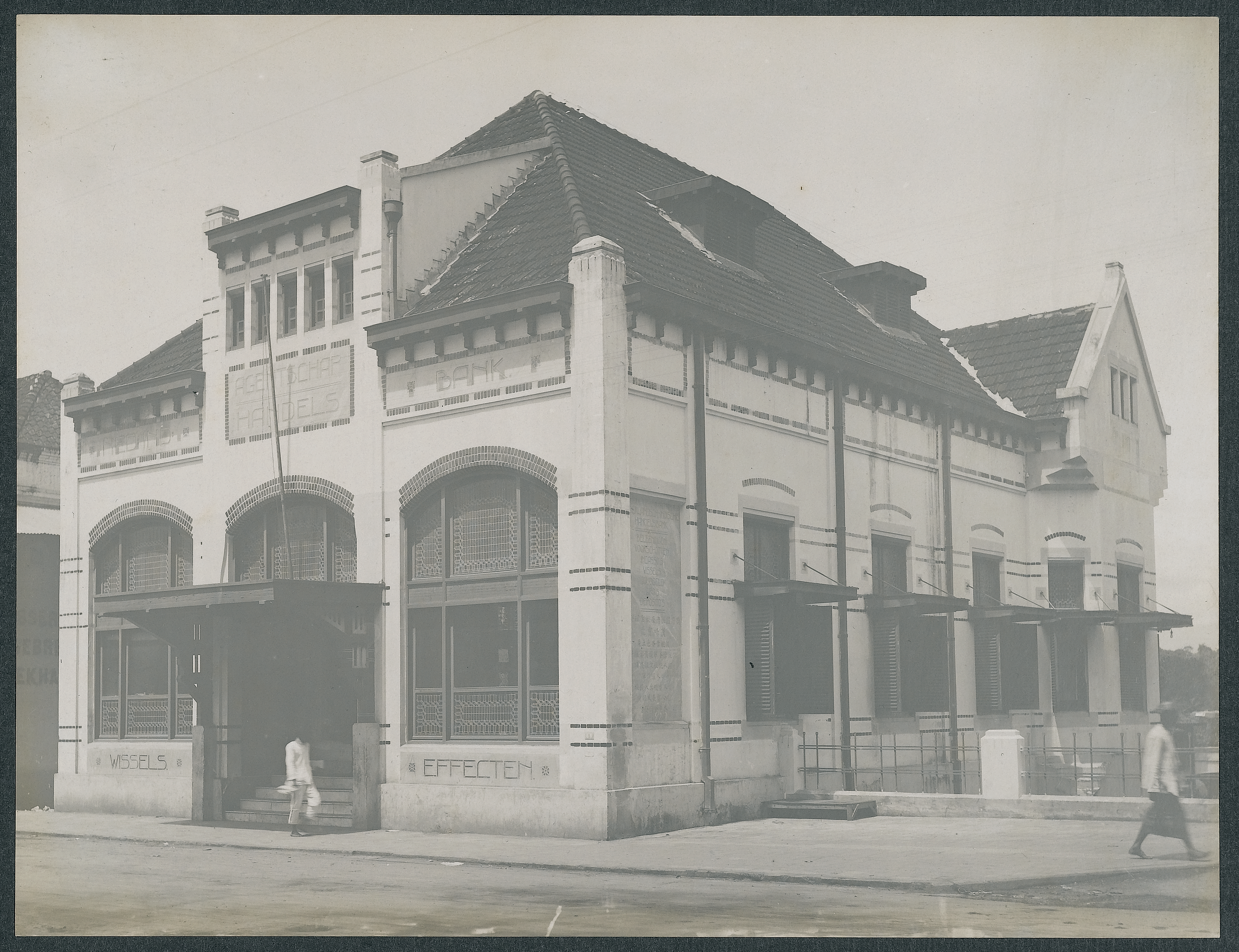
Branch in Bandoeng, 1920

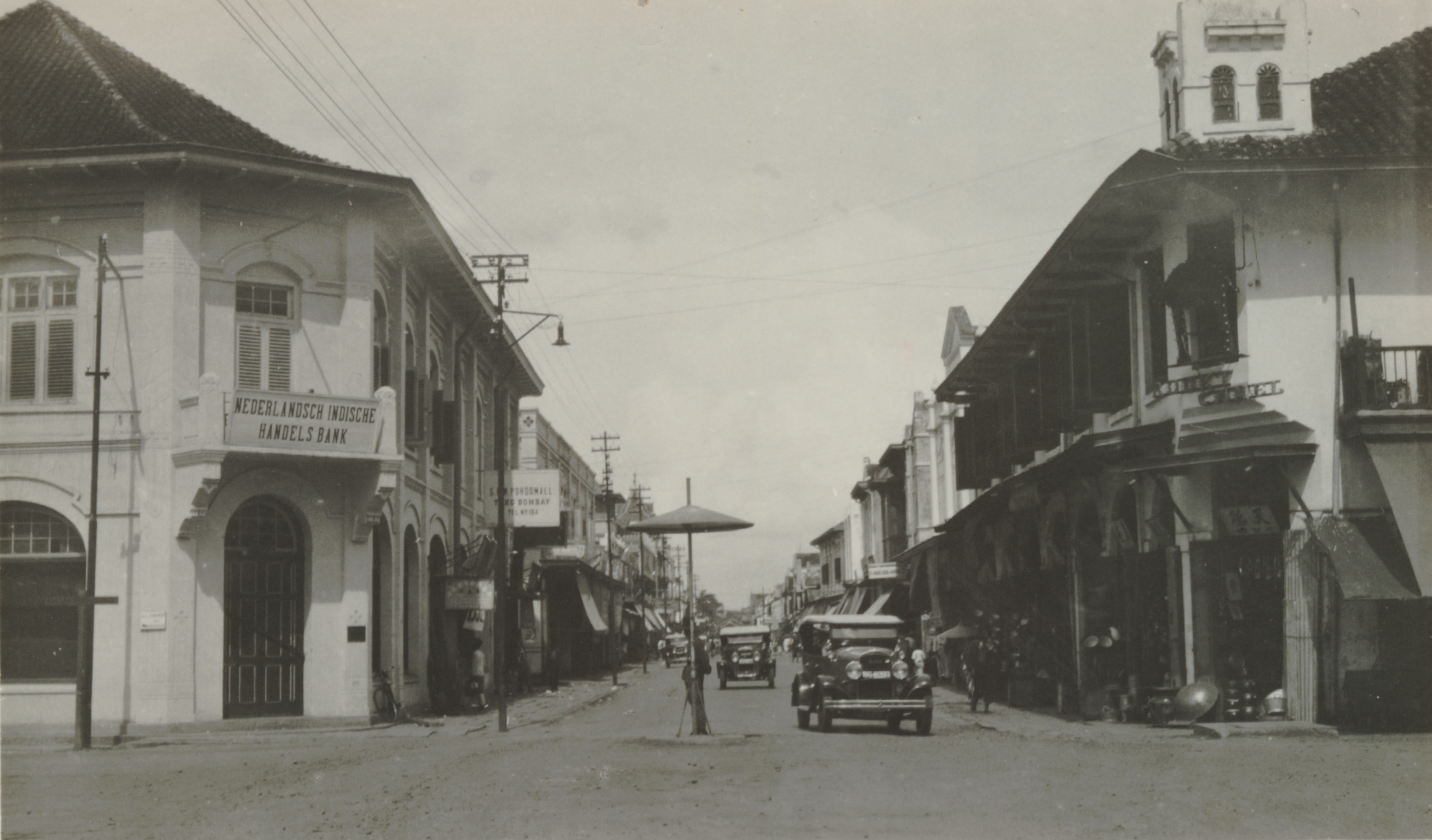
Branch in Palembang (left), ca. 1935

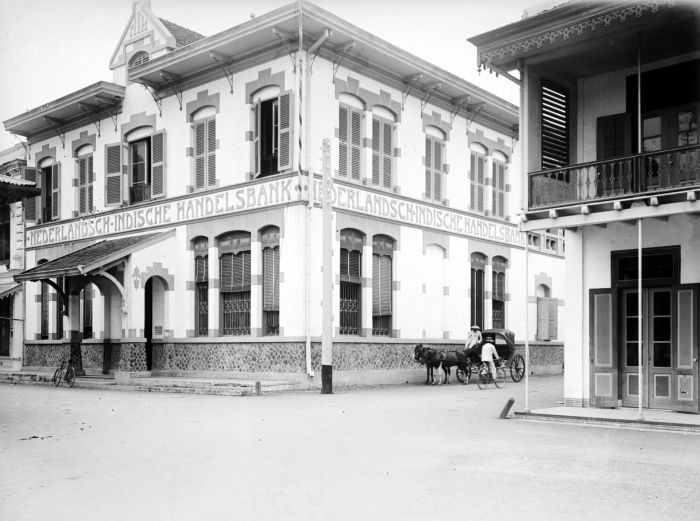
Branch in Semarang, 1920s

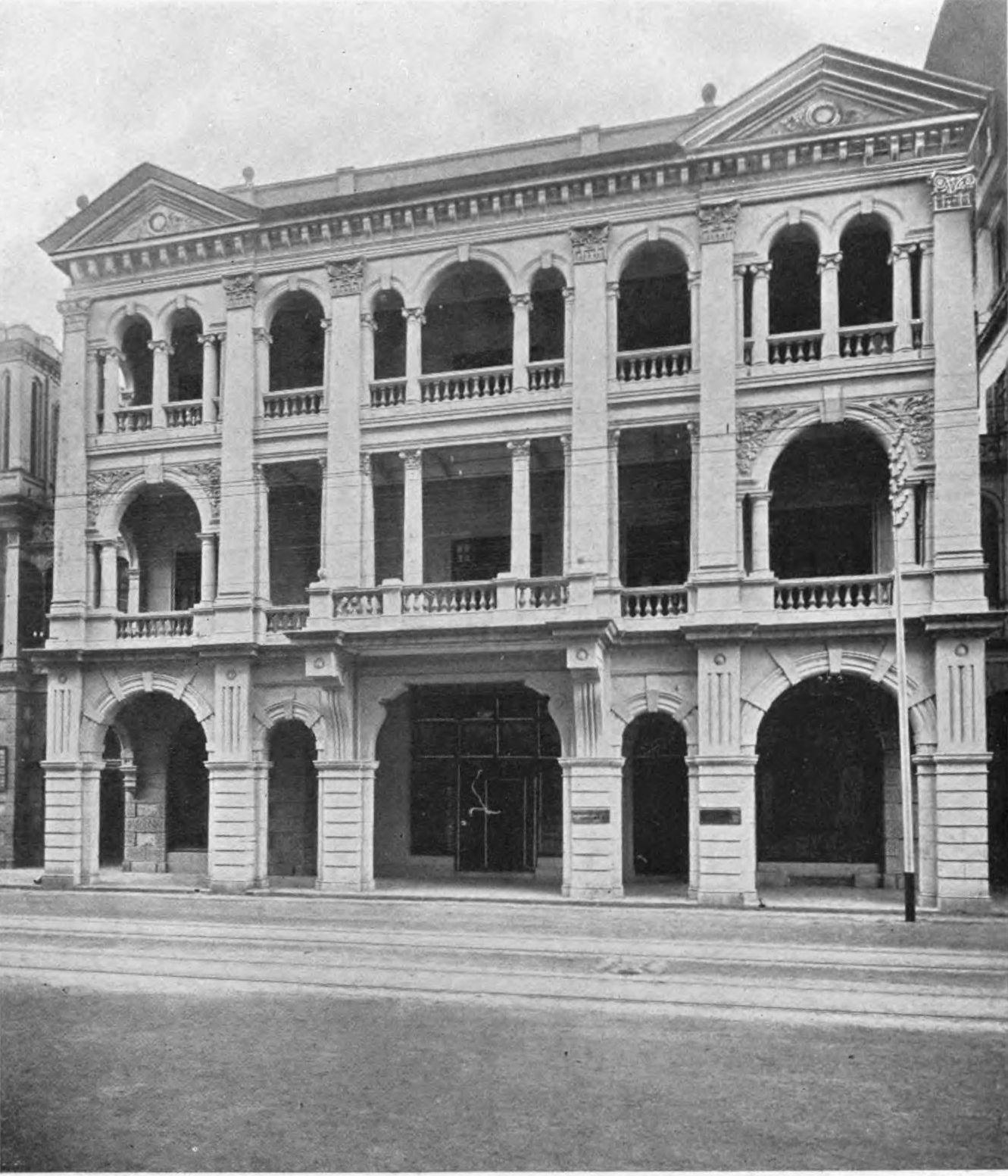
Branch in Hong Kong, ca. 1908

== Nationale Handelsbank ==
In 1950, the bank's name was changed to Nationale Handelsbank (NHB). It closed the branch in Manila, which had enjoyed a brief boom after World War II but now was no longer promising. In 1952 the branch in Kobe was still functioning, but it closed sometime thereafter. By 1953, the NHB had branches throughout Indonesia in Java (Bandoeng, Banjoewangi*, Gambir (Weltevreden), Malang, Probolinggo, Samarang, Soerabaja, Tegal*, and Tjirebon*), Soematra (Djambi, Medan, Palembang, Telok-Betoeng), Bandjarmasin, Pontianak, and Macassar. The branches marked with * dealt with warehousing and shipping matters. Prior to the Japanese invasion in 1942, the bank had also maintained branches at Pasoeroean, Tjilatjap, Pekalongan, Menado, Tandjoengbalai, and Gorontalo. Also in 1953, the NHB established Mercantile Bank of Canada, with offices in Montreal, Quebec, Canada.

In 1959, the Indonesian government nationalized the bank's operations in the country to create Bank Umum Negara, one of the predecessors of Bank Mandiri. This deprived the NHB of much of its operations. The next year, the Rotterdamsche Bank acquired the NHB, and in 1962 it sold its branches in Bangkok, Hong Kong, Singapore, and Tokyo to Chase Manhattan Bank. In 1963, it also sold 50% of Mercantile Bank to Citibank, and the other 50% in 1965 - giving rise to the “Mercantile Bank Affair”. Also in 1965, Nationale Handelsbank again changed its name to Nationale Bank voor Middellang Krediet (NBMK, lit. 'National Bank for Medium-Term Credit'). AMRO Bank, which had been formed in the meantime by the merger of Rotterdamsche Bank with Amsterdamsche Bank in 1964, fully absorbed NBMK in 1967.

== See also ==
- Bank of Java
- Netherlands Trading Company
- Nederlandsch-Indische Escompto Maatschappij
- Nederlandsch-Indische Levensverzekerings en Lijfrente Maatschappij
- Japanese government-issued currency in the Dutch East Indies
- List of banks in the Netherlands
