= Nederlandsch-Indische Escompto Maatschappij =

Dutch bank (founded 1857)

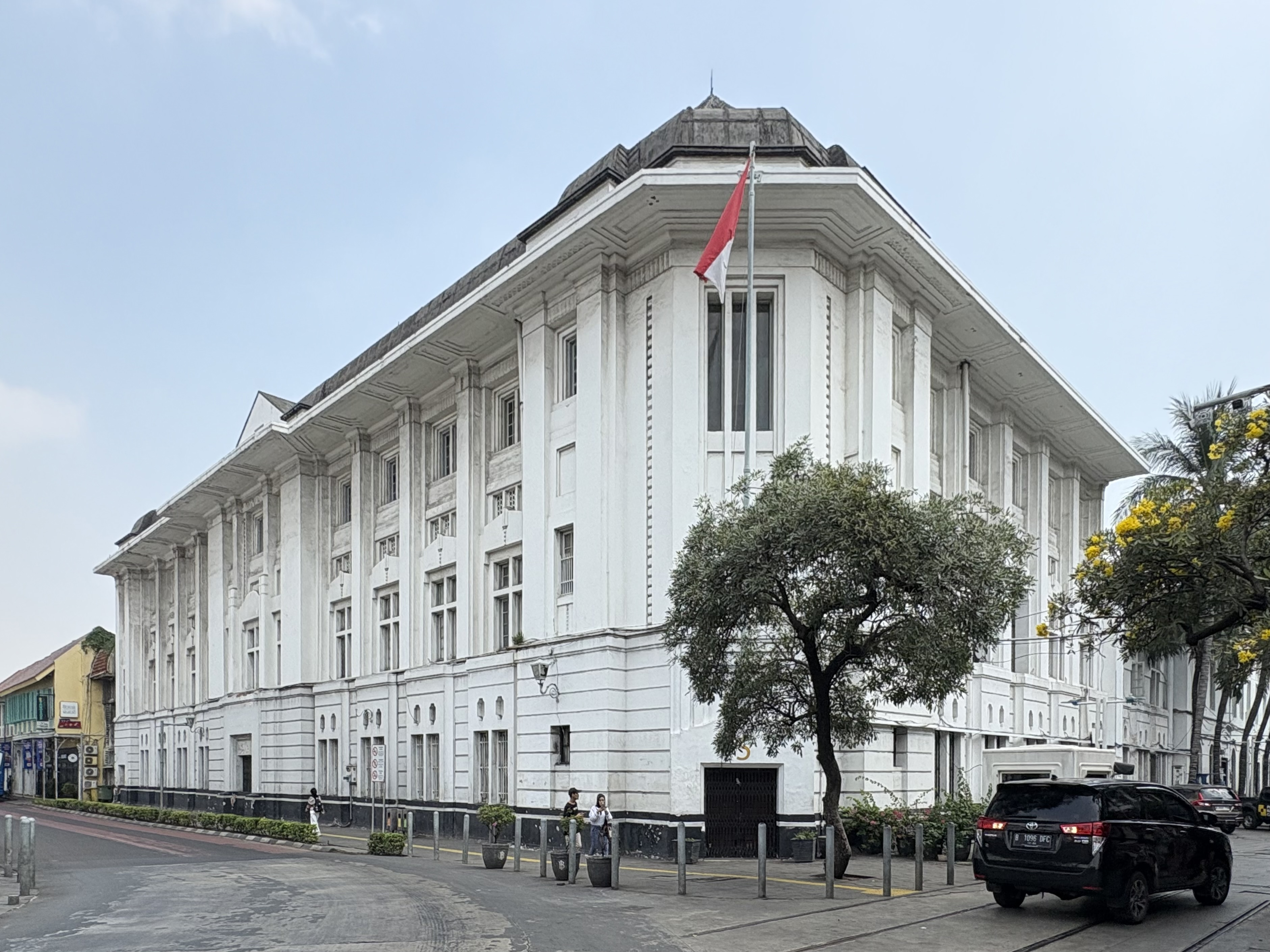
Former NIEM head office in Jakarta's Kota Tua, now owned by Bank Mandiri

The Nederlandsch-Indische Escompto Maatschappij (NIEM, lit. 'Dutch [East] Indies discount company') was a significant Dutch bank, founded in 1857 in Batavia, Dutch East Indies. In the first half of the 20th century, it was the smallest of the “big three” commercial banks, behind the Netherlands Trading Society and the Nederlandsch-Indische Handelsbank, that dominated the Dutch East Indies’ financial system alongside the note-issuing Bank of Java.

In 1949, following Indonesian independence, its name was changed to Escomptobank. Its main operations in Indonesia were nationalized in 1958 as Bank Dagang Negara, and later integrated into Bank Mandiri. Its residual Dutch operations went through multiple restructurings and mergers, and count among the many predecessor entities of ABN AMRO.

== Creation and development in the Dutch East Indies ==
The NIEM was founded in 1857 by Paulus Tiedeman Jr. and Carel Wiggers van Kerchem, initially as a subsidiary of their Tiedeman & van Kerchem partnership. It was only the second private financial institution (after the Bank of Java, established in 1828) from which merchants and traders in the Dutch East Indies could receive credit, as the Netherlands Trading Society had not yet become a bank by then. It engaged into no activities other than commercial banking, providing credit to trade and industry, and unlike other local players, did not extend long-term agricultural loans. For that reason, the agricultural crisis of 1884 hardly affected the NIEM.The NIEM remained small until 1888, then started to grow rapidly. In late 1901, the NIEM's shareholders decided to move away from the original partnership model. Jan Dinger left the partnership, in which he had joined Tiedeman and van Kerchem, and formed the NIEM's first management board together with Ede Abraham Zeilinga.

Since 1922 the head office in Batavia had been located in a building designed by L.M. van den Berg & W.H. Pichel. The NIEM had offices - with date and architect as far as is known- in, among others; Bandung (1912, P.A.J. Moojen), Batavia (1913, P.A.J. Moojen), Banjarmasin (1930, Fermont-Cuypers), Bogor (1932, J.J. Jiskoot)), Cirebon, Yogyakarta, Makassar, Magelang (1929,-), Malang (1929,-), Medan (1928, Fermont-Cuypers) Manado, Padang (1930, Fermont-Cuypers), Palembang (1938, Fermont-Cuypers), Purwokerto (1938, M.J.J. Vernac), Semarang (1913, P.A.J. Moojen), Sibolga (1939, J. Bennink), Surabaya (1913, P.A.J. Moojen) en Weltevreden, now Sawah Besar, Central Jakarta (1924, Fermont-Cuypers). It also opened branches in Amsterdam in 1910, at 575 Keizersgracht (which it kept until 1960), and in The Hague.

In 1912 the NIEM created a securities affiliate, the Nederlandsch-Indische Effecten- en Prolongatiebank, which it fully took over in 1921. The bank was severely affected by the financial crisis in 1931. Under the Japanese occupation of the Dutch East Indies during World War II, the occupation authorities first closed all Dutch and other Western banks in March 1942, starting with the Bank of Java, and sequestered them to seize as much as possible of their assets. Among the three largest commercial banks, the Japanese authorities determined that the Netherlands Trading Society had assets of more than 280 million Dutch guilders, the Nederlandsch-Indische Handelsbank had 158 million, and the NIEM had 99 million. Of these, the Japanese occupiers were able to seize 27 million guilders in total. The banks could only reopen after the surrender of Japan in the late summer of 1945.

== Indonesian independence and aftermath ==
In 1949, the NIEM changed its name to Escomptobank, but remained headquartered in Jakarta. In 1958, however, its operations in Indonesia were nationalized, and became part of Bank Dagang Negara, which in 1999 merged with there other state-owned banks, Bank Bumi Daya, Bank Ekspor Impor Indonesia, and Bank Pembangunan Indonesia, to form Bank Mandiri. As a consequence, most former NIEM properties in Indonesia became branches of Bank Mandiri.

The remaining operations, assets and claims in the Netherlands were restructured as Nedesco Bank, whose business activities were acquired in 1960 by the Nederlandse Overzee Bank. In 1969, the Nederlandse Overzee Bank in turn merged with Mees & Hope, which in 1975 was acquired by Algemene Bank Nederland. ABN then merged with AMRO Bank to form ABN AMRO in 1991, and in 1992 Mees & Hope subsequently merged with AMRO's investment banking arm, Pierson Heldring & Pierson, to form MeesPierson. In 1997, MeesPierson was acquired by Fortis Group, then nationalized in 2008 by the Dutch government together with Fortis Bank Nederland, which in 2009 was again renamed ABN AMRO.

== Gallery ==
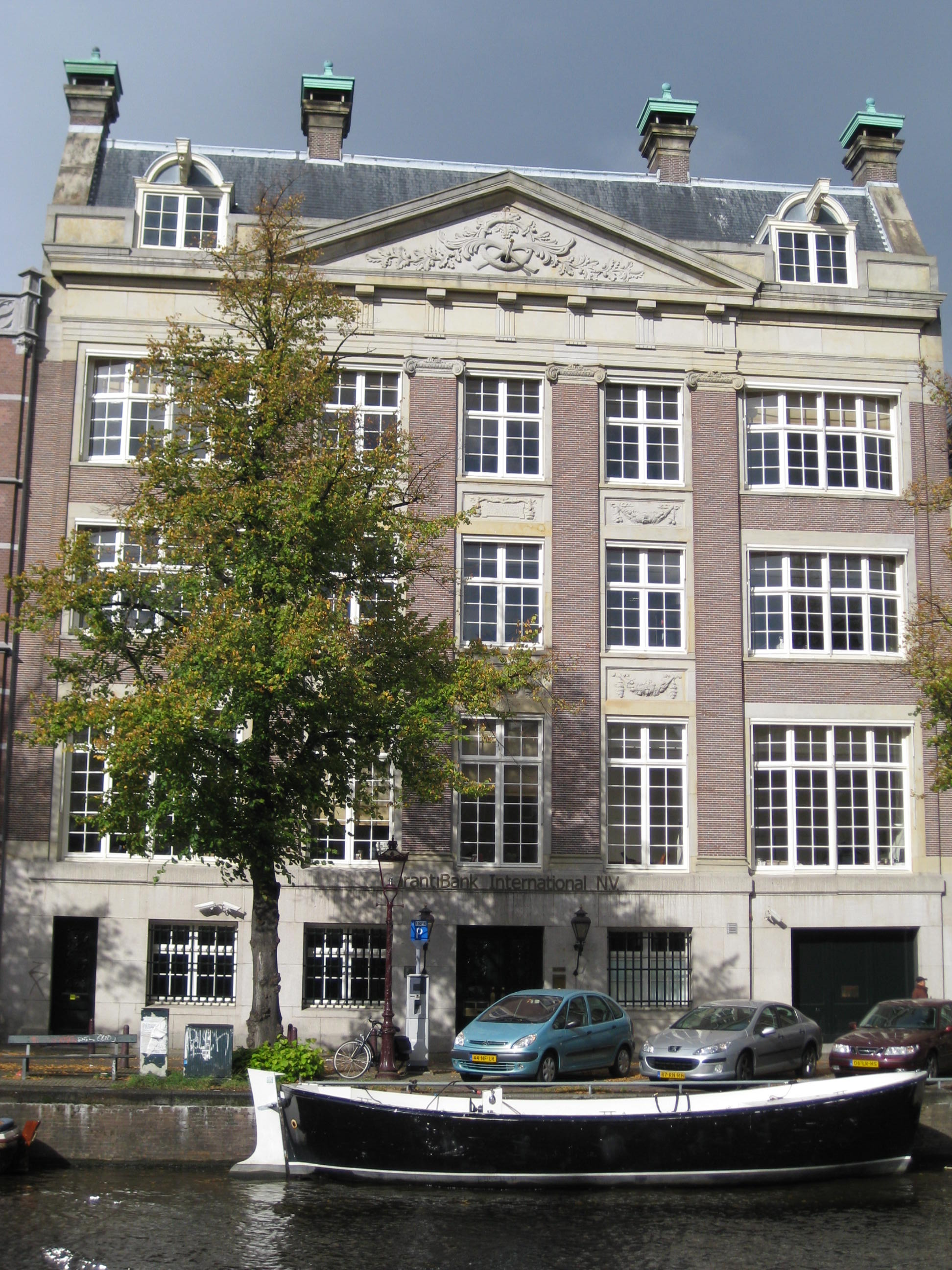
Keizersgracht 573 in Amsterdam

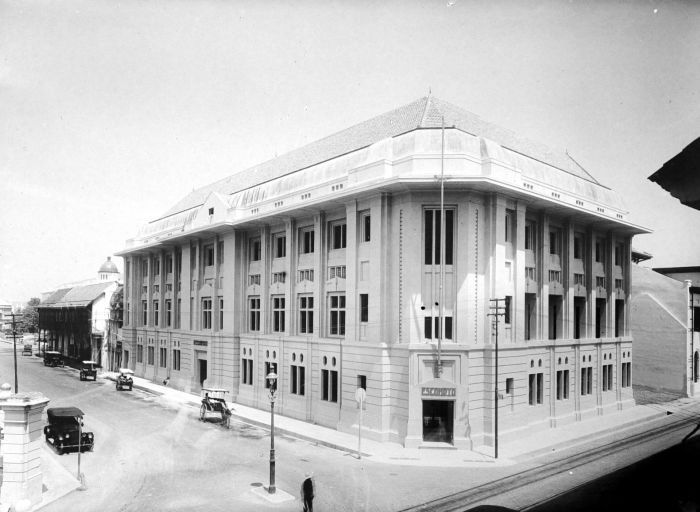
Main office in Batavia, interwar period

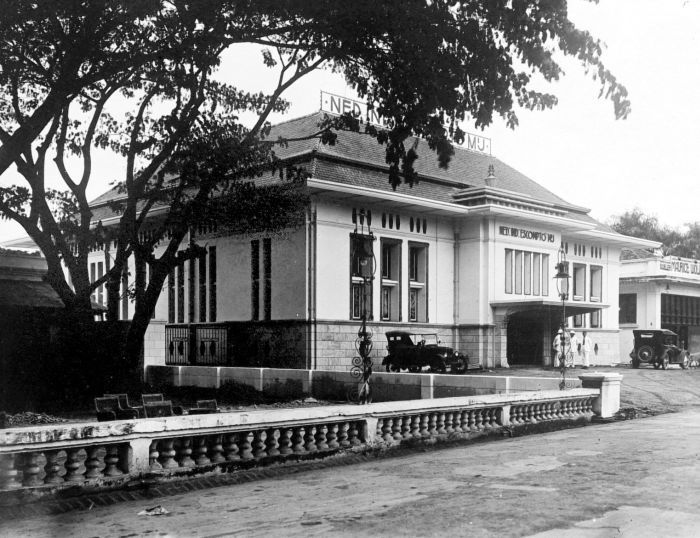
Branch office in Weltevreden, now Sawah Besar, Central Jakarta

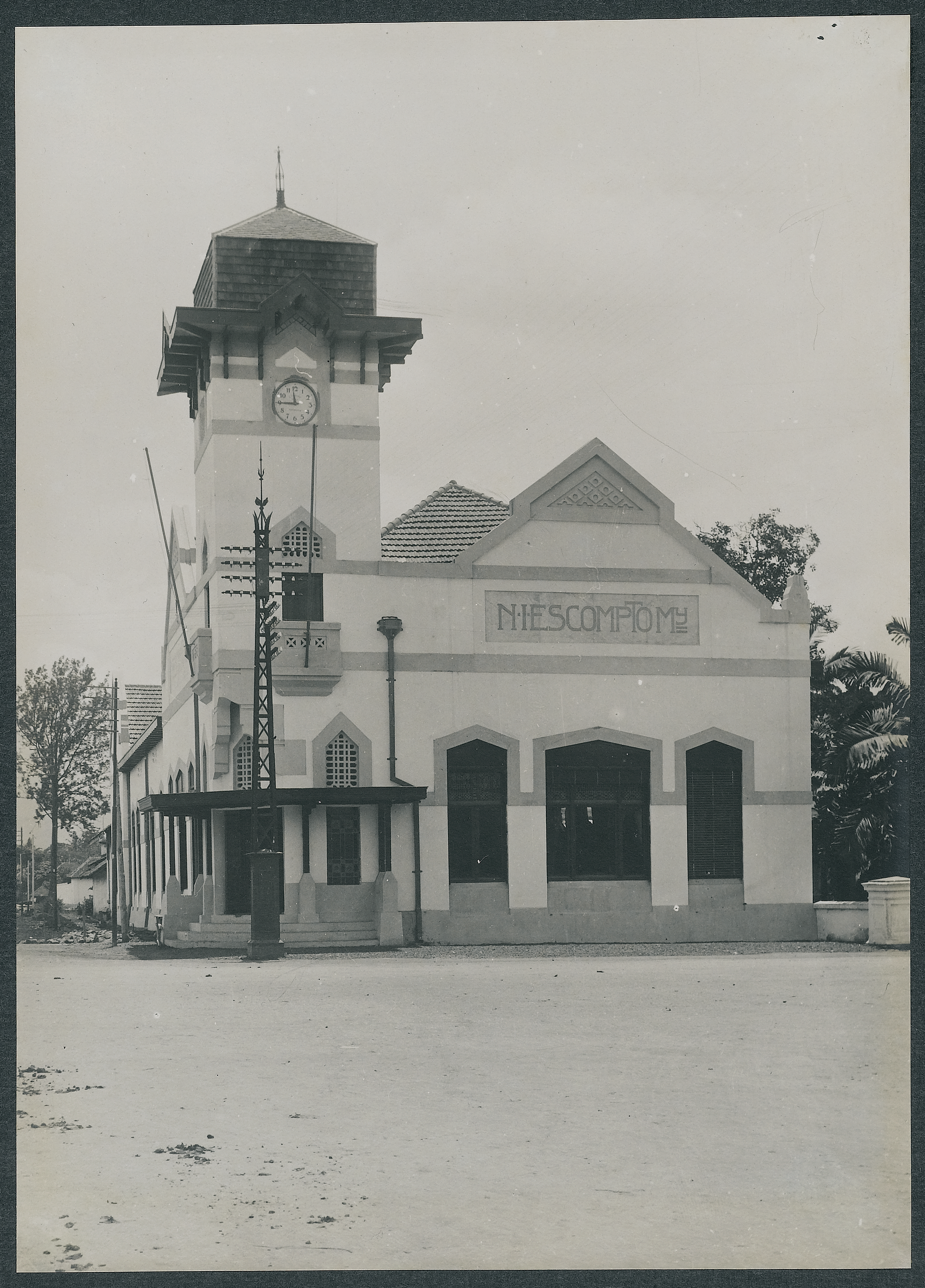
Branch office in Bandung, West Java1930s

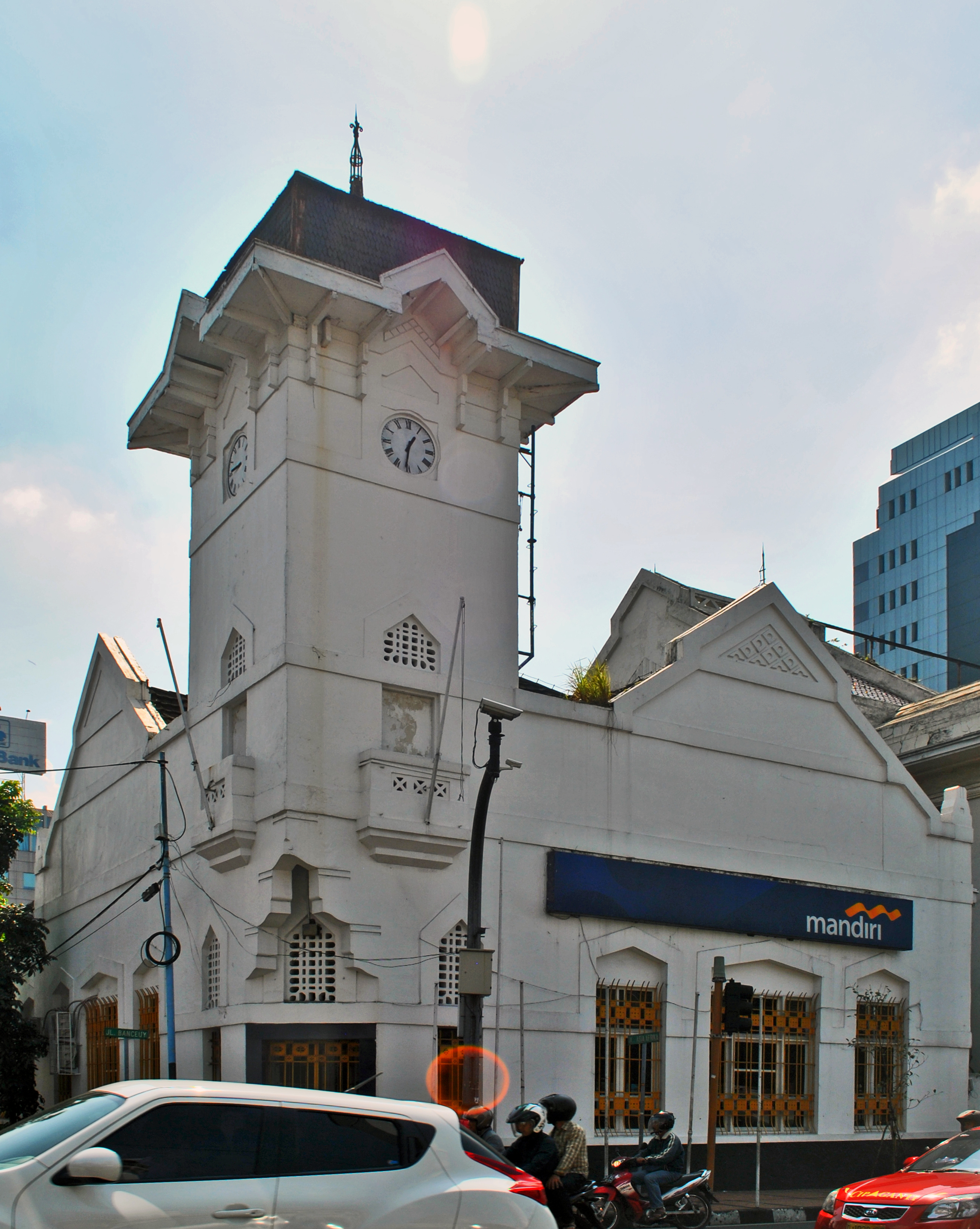
The same building in 2014, a branch of Bank Mandiri

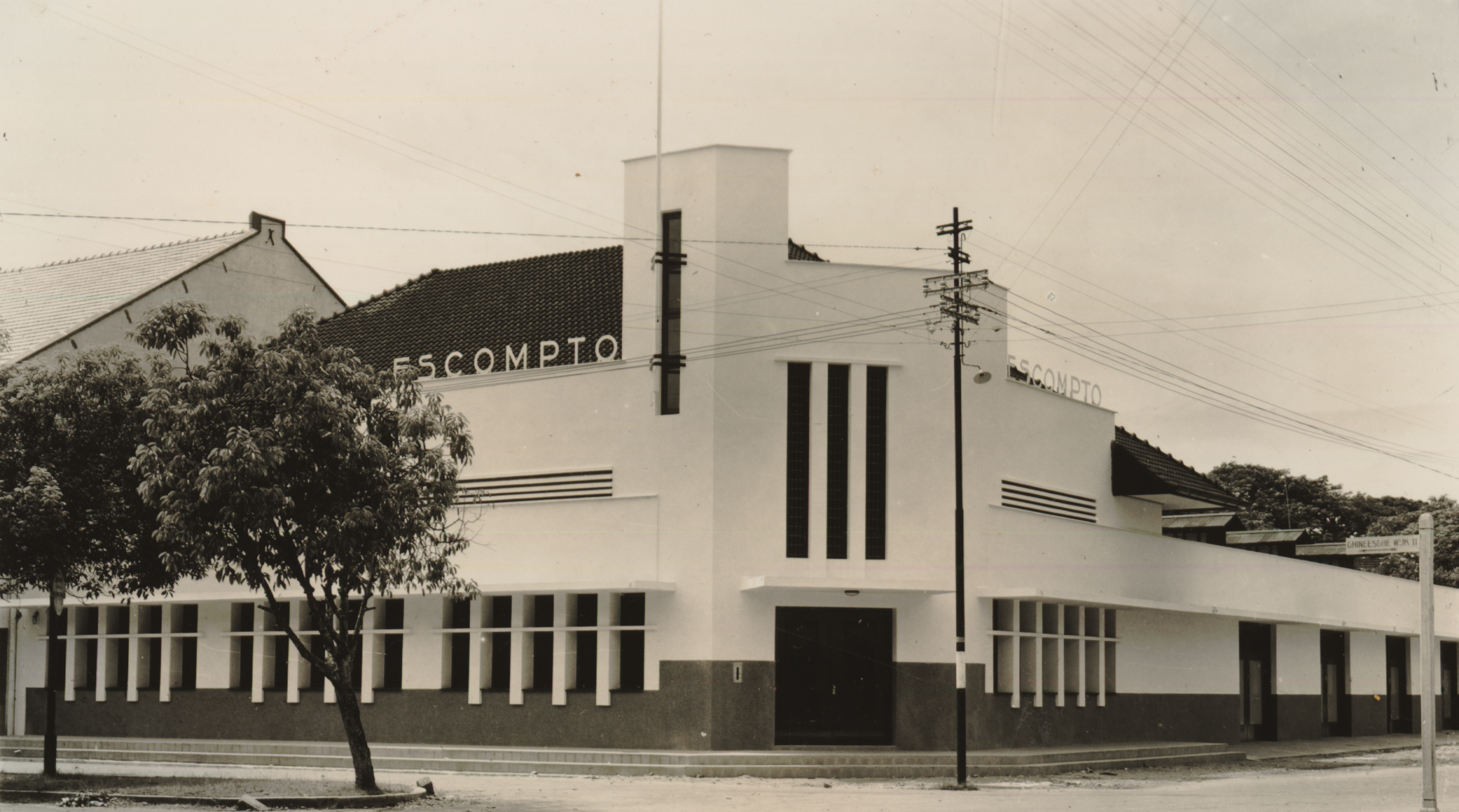
Branch office in Sibolga, North Sumatra

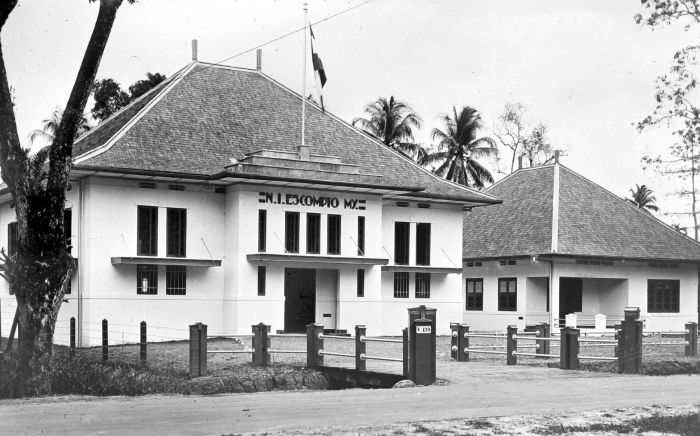
Branch office in Banjarmasin, South Kalimantan

== See also ==
- Bank of Java
- Netherlands Trading Society
- Nederlandsch-Indische Handelsbank
- Nederlandsch-Indische Levensverzekerings en Lijfrente Maatschappij
- Japanese government-issued currency in the Dutch East Indies
- List of banks in the Netherlands
