= Rotterdamsche Bank =

Former Dutch bank

- Formerly: Rotterdamsche Bankvereeniging (1911–1947)
- Company type: Bank
- Industry: Banking, financial services
- Founded: 16 May 1863
- Defunct: 1964
- Fate: Merged with Amsterdamsche Bank
- Successor: AMRO Bank
- Headquarters: Rotterdam, Netherlands
- Area served: Netherlands

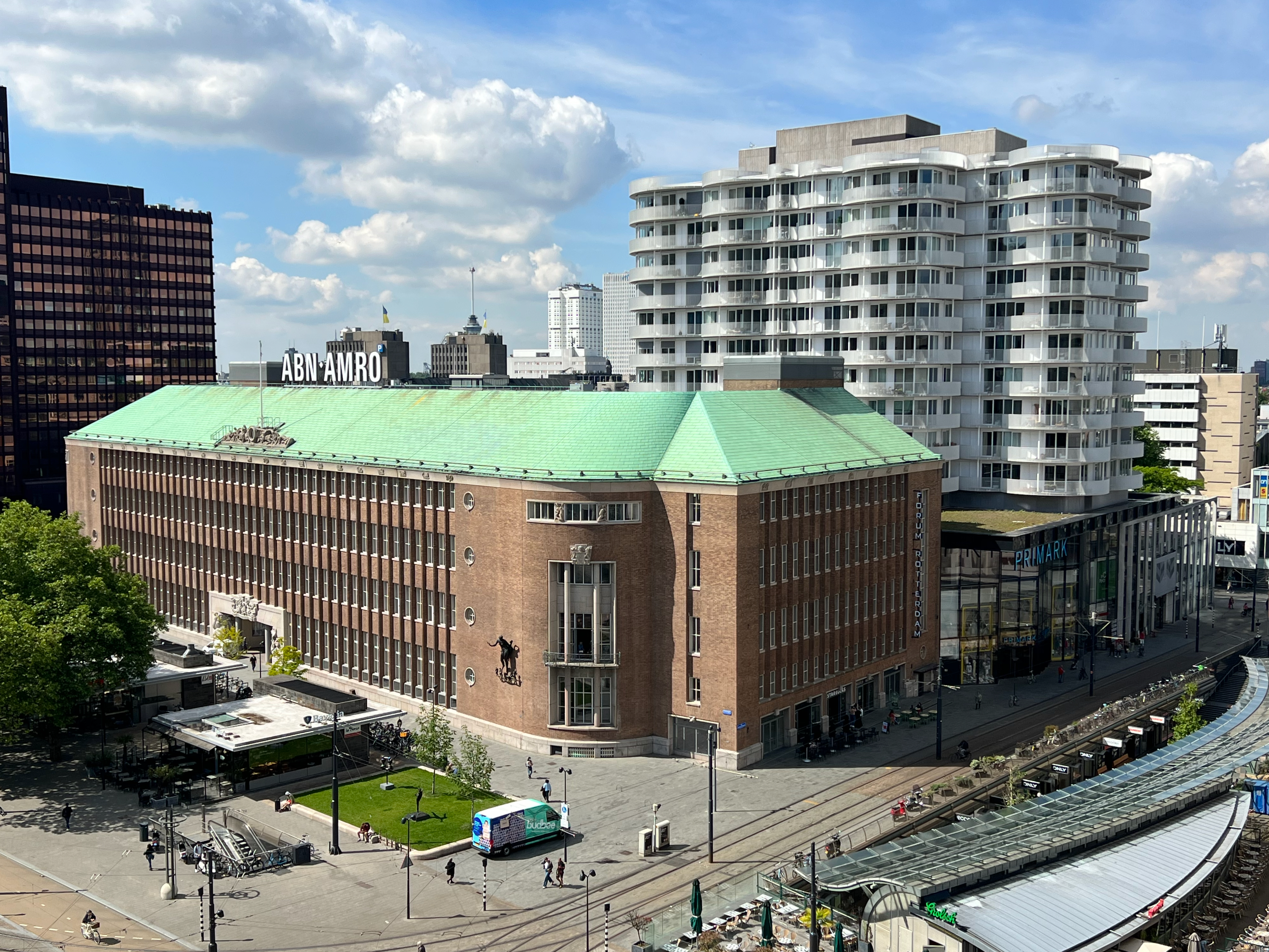
Former head office of the Rotterdamsche Bank on Coolsingel, Rotterdam, built 1941-1949

The Rotterdamsche Bank, known from 1911 to 1947 as Rotterdamsche Bankvereeniging or Robaver, was a significant bank in the Netherlands, founded in 1863. In 1964, it merged with Amsterdamsche Bank to form AMRO Bank (for AMsterdamsche & ROtterdamsche).

== Overview ==
The Rotterdamsche Bank was established on 16 May 1863 by a group of businessmen and bankers, who took inspiration from the British Colonial Bank and aimed at financing trade and investment in the Dutch East Indies. After a difficult start, however, the bank soon focused on domestic business.

Between 1911 and 1947, it was known as the Union Bank of Rotterdam (Dutch: Rotterdamsche Bank Vereeniging, abbreviated as Robaver), following its 1911 acquisition of Rotterdam competitor Deposito- en Administratie Bank (est. 1900) and soon afterwards of Amsterdam brokers Determeijer Weslingh & Zn. (est. 1765). Under the leadership of its ambitious managing director, Willem Westerman, it acquired several local banks. Still, it became overextended and had to be restructured under the aegis of De Nederlandsche Bank in the mid-1920s. In 1928, it created the Vrouwenbank ("Women's Bank"), a bank targeted at a female customer base that lasted until 1971.

In 1960, Rotterdamsche Bank acquired Nationale Handelsbank, a major former colonial bank known until 1950 as the Dutch-Indian Trade Bank (Dutch: Nederlandsch-Indische Handelsbank, NIHB; est. 1863).

== Gallery ==
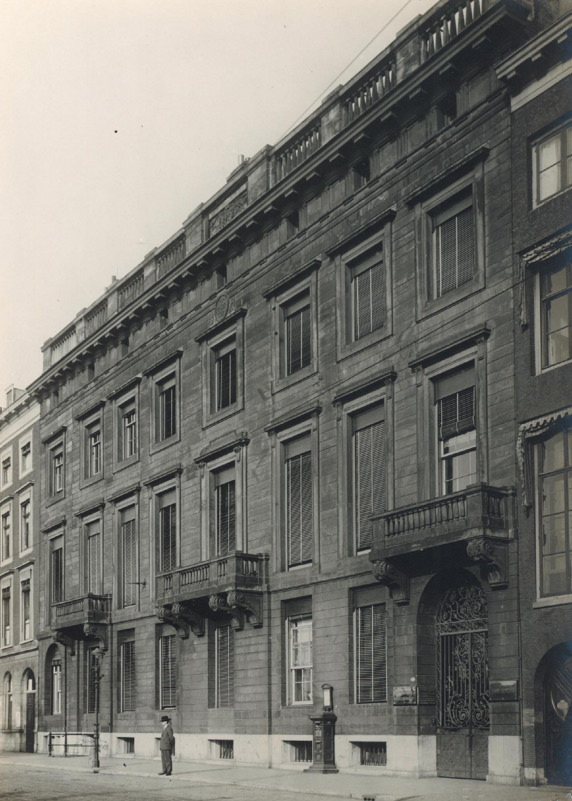
Pre-World War II Rotterdamsche Bank head office on the Boompjes waterfront thoroughfare, ca. 1905

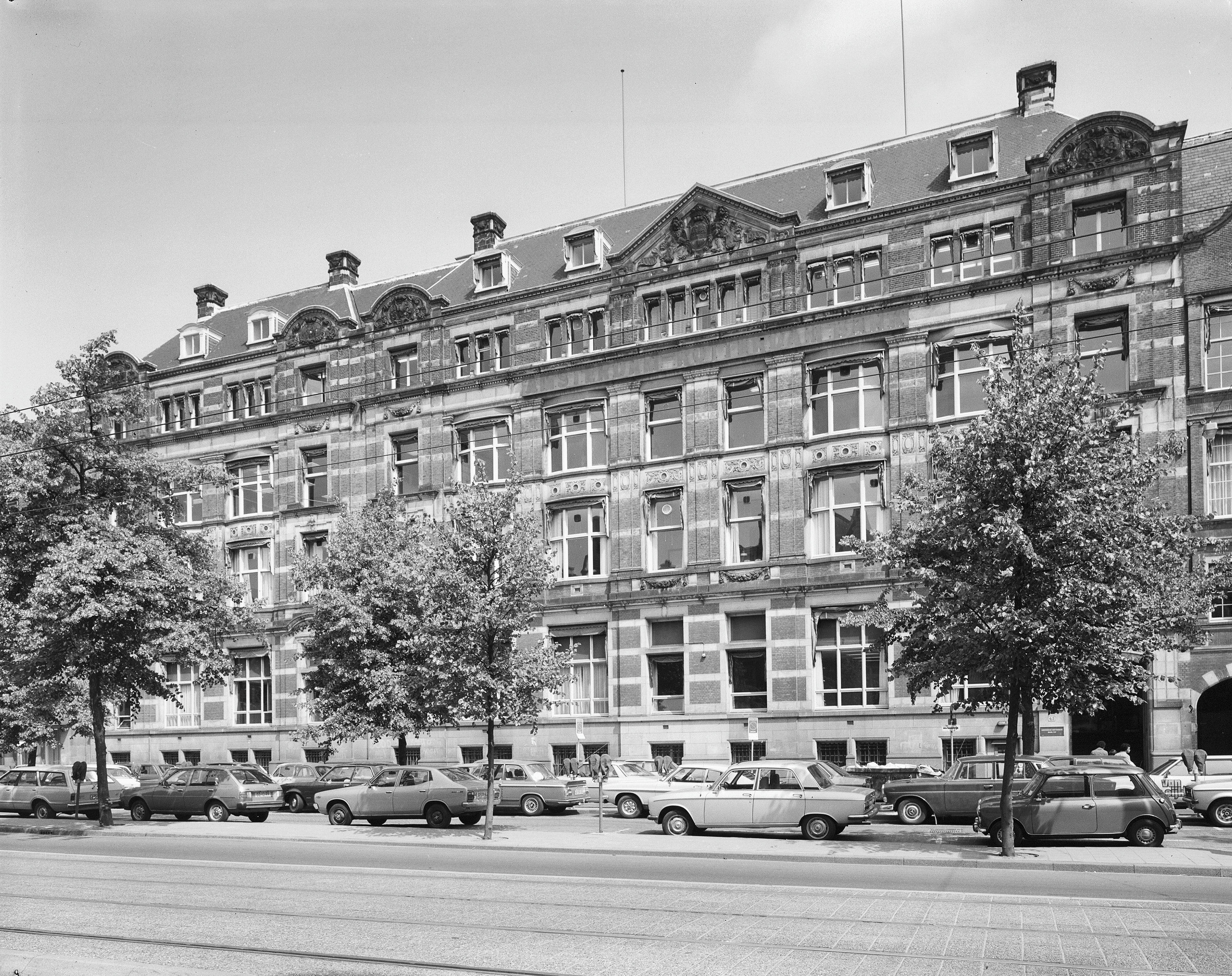
Branch on Rokin in Amsterdam, 1979 (demolished since then)

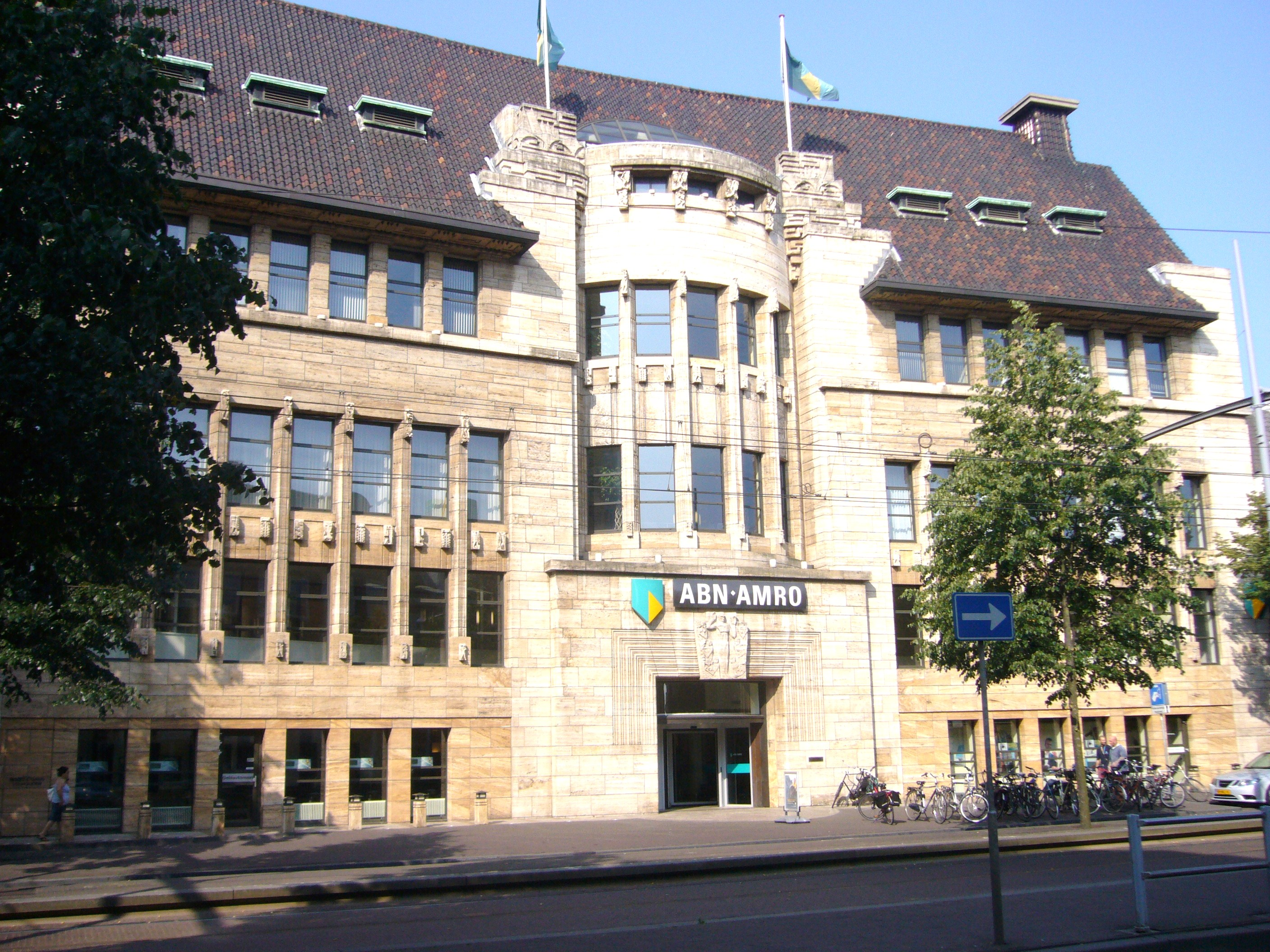
Former branch building at Kneuterdijk 8, The Hague

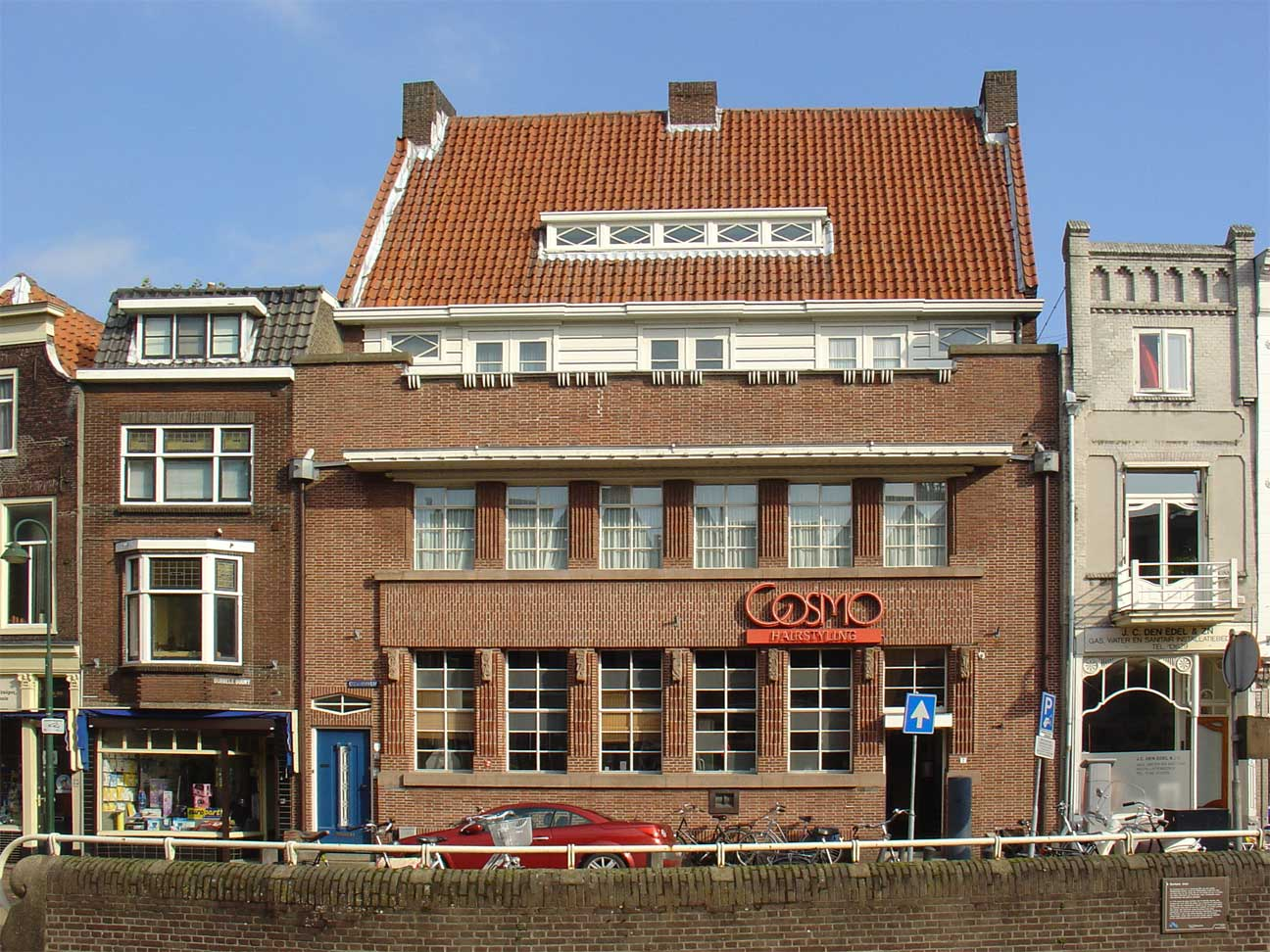
Former branch building in Gouda

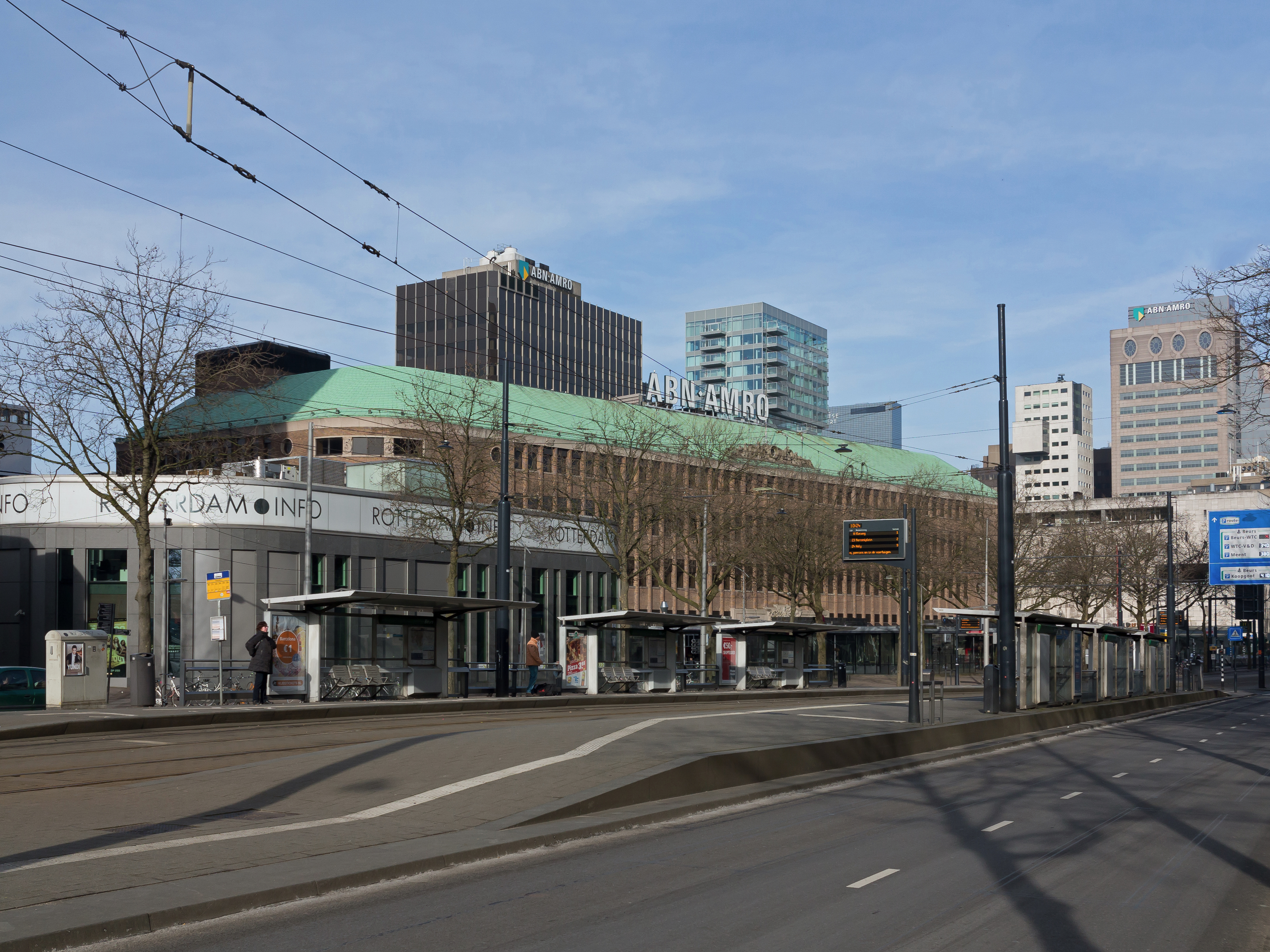
The Rotterdamsche Bank building on Coolsingel constructed in 1941

== See also ==
- Rabobank
- List of banks in the Netherlands
