= Bank Mandiri =

Indonesian bank

PT Bank Mandiri (Persero) Tbk
- Logo used since 2016

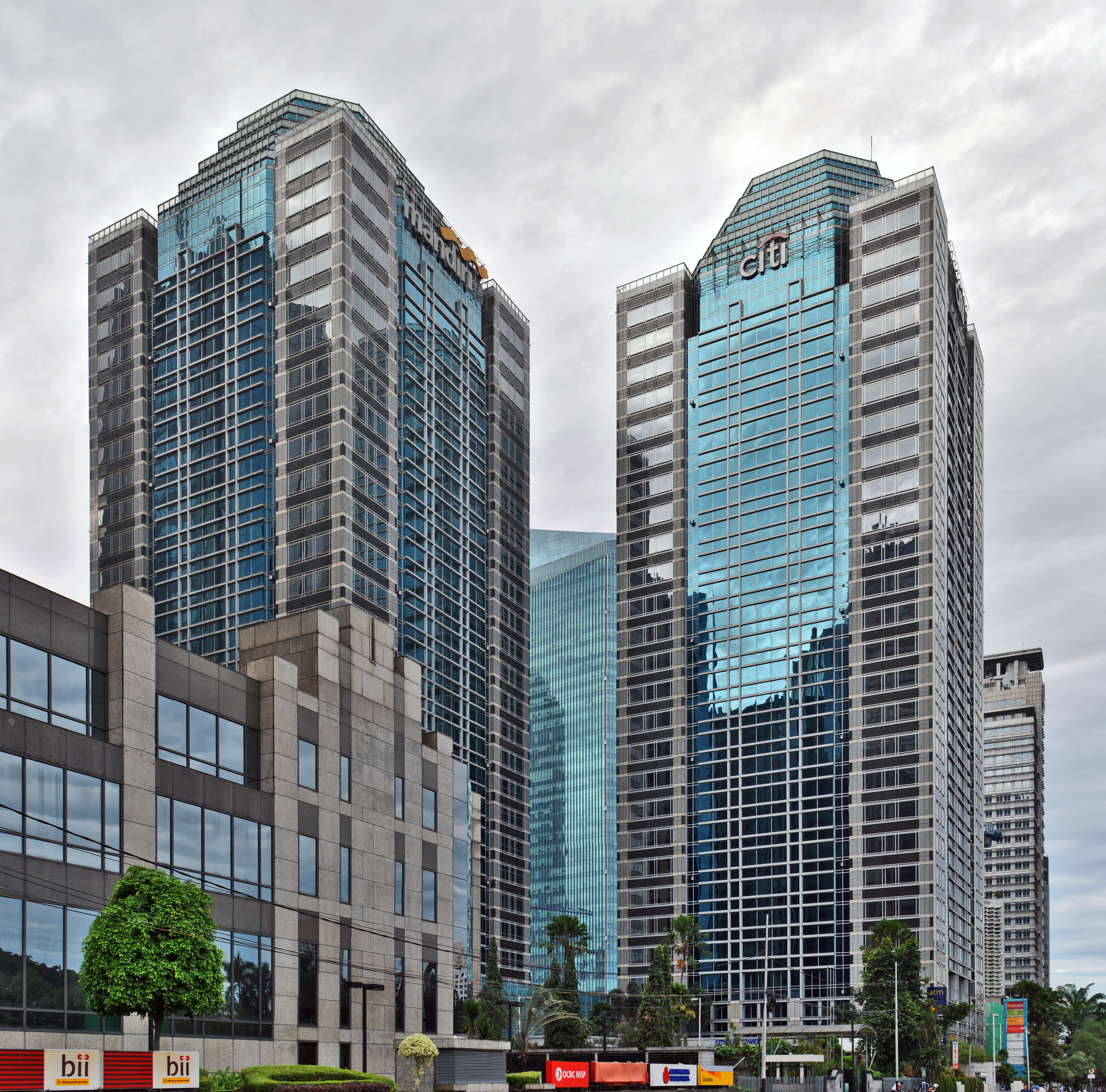
- Menara Mandiri (Mandiri Tower[s]) in Jakarta, the Bank Mandiri headquarters since 2025
- Type: Public (Perseroan terbatas)
- Traded as: IDX: BMRI
- Industry: Financial services, banking
- Predecessors: PT Bank Bumi Daya (Persero); PT Bank Dagang Negara (Persero); PT Bank Ekspor Impor Indonesia (Persero) (BankExim); PT Bank Pembangunan Indonesia (Persero) (Bapindo)
- Founded: 2 October 1998; 28 years ago
- Founder: Government of Indonesia by merging several of its state-owned banks
- Headquarters: Jakarta, Indonesia
- Key people: Riduan, President Director; Kuswiyoto, President Commissioner
- Revenue: ▲ Rp 164.41 trillion (2025)
- Operating income: ▲ Rp 76.31 trillion (2025)
- Net income: ▲ Rp 56.294 trillion (2025)
- Total assets: ▲ Rp 2.829 trillion (2025)
- Total equity: ▲ Rp 327.402 trillion (2025)
- Owner: Danantara Asset Management (51.48%); State-Owned Enterprises Regulatory Agency (0.52%)
- Number of employees: 38,732 (2025)
- Subsidiaries: Mandiri Sekuritas; AXA Mandiri; Bank Mandiri Taspen; Mandiri Tunas Finance; Mandiri Inhealth (80%); Bank Syariah Indonesia (51.47%)
- Website: www.bankmandiri.co.id
- Footnotes; Financials as of fiscal year ended 31 December 2025.

PT Bank Mandiri (Persero) Tbk or Bank Mandiri, (stylized in lower-case with dotless I) headquartered in Jakarta, is the largest bank in Indonesia in terms of assets, loans and deposits as of 2014. Total assets as of 2025, were Rp. 2.829 trillion (around US$168 billion). As of 2022, Bank Mandiri is the largest bank in Indonesia by total assets.

As of December 2022, the bank had 2,364 branches spread across three different time zones in Indonesia and 7 branches abroad, about 13,027 automatic teller machines (ATMs), and 11 subsidiaries, such as: Mandiri Sekuritas, Mandiri Tunas Finance, AXA Mandiri Financial Services, Bank Mandiri Taspen, and Mandiri AXA General Insurance.

== History ==
=== Pre-merger ===
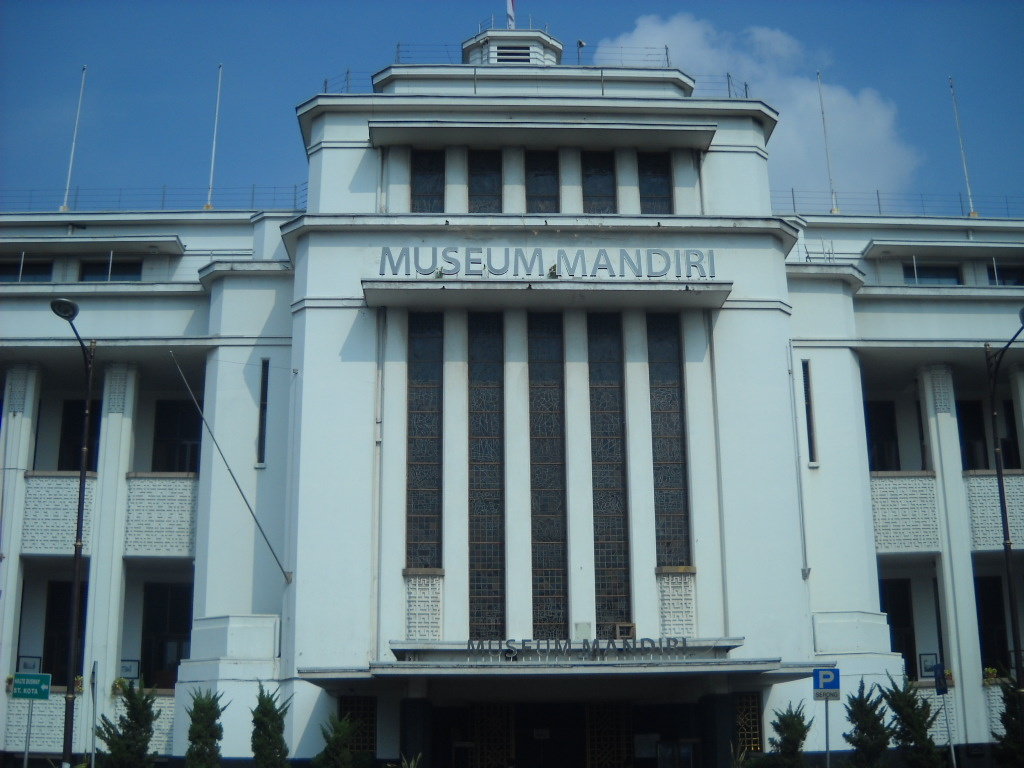
The Museum Mandiri, the former Dutch East Indian headquarters of the Netherlands Trading Society that was nationalised after the independence period.

Bank Mandiri is the result of the merger made by Indonesian government from four older government-owned banks that failed in 1998. Those four banks were Bank Bumi Daya, Bank Dagang Negara, Bank Ekspor Impor Indonesia, and Bank Pembangunan Indonesia. During the amalgamation and reorganisation, the government reduced the number of branches by 194 and the number of personnel from 26,600 to 17,620.

Bank Bumi Daya and Bank Ekspor Impor Indonesia was previously merged in 1965 by the Guided Democracy government into Bank Negara Indonesia (BNI) umbrella. The Indonesian government then reorganized the banks in 1968 as the New Order government took place.

- Bank Bumi Daya (BBD) started in 1959, when the government nationalized Nationale Handelsbank's operations in Indonesia as a part of boycott on Dutch companies amid both nation's dispute over Western New Guinea, and from them the government created Bank Umum Negara ("State General Bank"). In 1964, during Konfrontasi, the government nationalized Chartered Bank's operations in Indonesia and merged them into Bank Umum Negara; the British overseas bank had first entered Indonesia in 1863 when it opened an agency in Batavia (now Jakarta). In 1965 the government brought Bank Umum Negara into BNI, renaming it Bank Negara Indonesia Unit IV (BNI IV), but in 1968 BNI IV became an independent bank again with the name Bank Bumi Daya.
- Bank Ekspor Impor Indonesia (BankExim, "Export Import Bank of Indonesia") was created in 1960 as the Indonesian government nationalized the Indonesian operations of Nederlandsche Handel-Maatschappij. The bank then merged into BNI by the government in 1965 and became Bank Negara Indonesia Unit II (BNI II). In 1968, the government split BNI II into two parts, with the BNI Unit II Export-Import Division becoming BankExim, which specialised in trade finance.
- Bank Dagang Negara (BDN, "State Trading Bank") was established in 1960 from the nationalization of Escomptobank. Escomptobank NV, previously Nederlandsch Indische Escompto Maatschappij until 1949, was established in Batavia in 1857.
- Bank Pembangunan Indonesia (Bapindo, "Development Bank of Indonesia") had its root from Bank Industri Negara (BIN, "State Industrial Bank"), which was established in 1951. The bank was aimed to finance priority sectors, such as plantations, industry and mining. In 1960, the Indonesian government established Bapindo and merged BIN into it. Bapindo specialised in medium and long-term financing of manufacturing, tourism and transportation. In 1986, Bapindo expanded into general commercial banking.

=== Merger and later history ===
The former logo of Bank Mandiri, used until 14 January 2008

The second logo of Bank Mandiri, used from 14 January 2008 until October 2016. Since October 2016, the "ribbon" logo goes flat.

The current logo of Bank Mandiri, used since October 2016 with slogan.

In 1998, the government merged BBD, BDN, BankExim and Bapindo to create Bank Mandiri to restructurize some state-owned banks to manage impacts of financial crisis at the time. Bank Mandiri was established on 2 October 1998, and the merged banks operated effectively as a single bank starting on 31 July 1999. The name Mandiri (Indonesian for "self-reliant" or "independent") was coined by President B. J. Habibie during his presidency, with the hope that the bank could become a self-reliant bank and encourage the people, especially who need microfinancing, to also become self-reliant.

In 2004, the bank opened a branch in Dili, East Timor and a representative office in Shanghai, China.

== Products ==
Kopra by Mandiri and Livin by Mandiri logos, both are mobile banking application operated by Bank Mandiri

=== Consumer banking ===
1. Mandiri Savings:
  - Mandiri Saving account
  - Mandiri Business Saving
  - Mandiri Plan Saving
  - Mandiri Hajj Saving
  - Mandiri Foreign Currency Saving
2. Mandiri Current account
  - Mandiri Current Account
3. Mandiri DepositMandiri Deposit
  - Mandiri Foreign Currency Deposit
4. Mandiri Debit
  - Mandiri Debit
5. Mandiri Prepaid
  - GazCard
  - Indomaret Card
  - E-toll Card
6. Mandiri credit card
  - Mandiri Visa
  - Mandiri Mastercard
  - Mandiri JCB
7. Mandiri consumer loan
  - Mandiri KPR
  - Mandiri KPR Multiguna
  - Mandiri personal loan
  - Mandiri Mitrakarya
  - Mandiri Tunas KPM
8. Mandiri Priority Services
  - Mandiri Priority Services
  - Merchant Relations Program
9. Investment Products
  - Mutual funds
  - ORI & Sukuk Ritel
10. Bancassurance
  - Mandiri Investasi Sejahtera
  - Mandiri Jiwa Sejahtera
  - Mandiri Rencana Sejahtera
11. Retail Brokerage Service
  - Retail Brokerage
12. Consumer Banking Treasury (CBT)
  - Consumer Banking Treasury

=== Mobile banking ===
1. Livin' by Mandiri
2. Kopra by Mandiri

== Subsidiaries ==
=== International ===
- Bank Mandiri Singapore Branch, operate under wholesale bank licence granted by Monetary Authority of Singapore
- Bank Mandiri Hong Kong Branch
- Bank Mandiri Cayman Islands Branch
- Bank Mandiri Dili Branch
- Bank Mandiri Shanghai Branch
- Bank Mandiri (Europe) Limited, located in London, UK. Subsidiary of PT Bank Mandiri (Persero) Tbk.

=== Principal ===
- Mandiri Sekuritas, at Capital Market Awards 2011, PT Mandiri Sekuritas got 3 awards from 9 awards (Marketing Net, the Best Bond Emiten, and the Best Stock Exchange member)
- AXA Mandiri Financial Services
- Bank Sinar Harapan Bali (BSHB) (now Bank Mandiri Taspen or Bank Mantap)
- Mandiri Tunas Finance
- Mandiri Utama Finance
- Mandiri AXA General Insurance
- Asuransi Jiwa InHealth Indonesia (now Mandiri InHealth)

== Awards ==
Based on mystery shopper method done by surveyor, in 2011 Bank Mandiri got average value 91.23 percent, a first time for a bank got more than 90 percent over 15 years survey. Bank Mandiri got Service Excellence Award for 4 times consecutives and got The Most Consistent Bank for 2 times.

In 2025, Bank Mandiri was ranked 35th among the world's most trustworthy banks in the Newsweek World's Most Trustworthy Companies 2025 ranking, a survey of 65,000 participants across 20 countries assessing customer, investor, and employee trust.

== Controversy ==
On 21 August 2026, a bank account belonging to an activist used to collect donations for a planned protest in Jakarta by residents of Pati was blocked by Bank Mandiri just days before the United Pati Community Alliance (Aliansi Masyarakat Pati Bersatu; AMPB) was scheduled to stage a demonstration in front of the House of Representatives on 27 August. The blocking of the account came to light after a video featuring an AMPB activist named Botok circulated on social media on August 22. In the video, uploaded by the X account @cprxn_id, Botok stated that his account containing both personal funds and donation money totaling approximately IDR 80.9 million had been blocked. The matter subsequently drew the attention of netizens, prompting calls for clarification from Bank Mandiri. Through its official account, Bank Mandiri stated that the account was blocked in response to a request from law enforcement authorities. In the video, Botok, the coordinator of AMPB, stated that his personal account is used to hold both his own money and donation funds that had been blocked. "To make matters worse, my account containing my personal funds and donations from friends, totaling over 80.9 million has been blocked," Botok said in the video. He then displayed a screenshot from the Livin’ by Mandiri app as evidence to support his claim. The video subsequently circulated widely on social media, drawing the attention of netizens. After the video went viral, an X user with the handle @manaf327 asked Bank Mandiri for clarification regarding the account blockage. Bank Mandiri then provided an explanation via its official account, stating that the blockage was a follow-up action to a request from law enforcement authorities. "We would like to inform you that the blocking of the account was a measure taken by Bank Mandiri in response to a request from law enforcement authorities and was carried out in accordance with applicable procedures and regulations," Bank Mandiri wrote. "Bank Mandiri remains committed to supporting law enforcement processes while upholding the principles of Good Corporate Governance (GCG), compliance, and prudence in delivering banking services," they added.

== See also ==
- State-owned enterprises of Indonesia
- Danantara
