= Amsterdamsche Bank =

Former Dutch bank

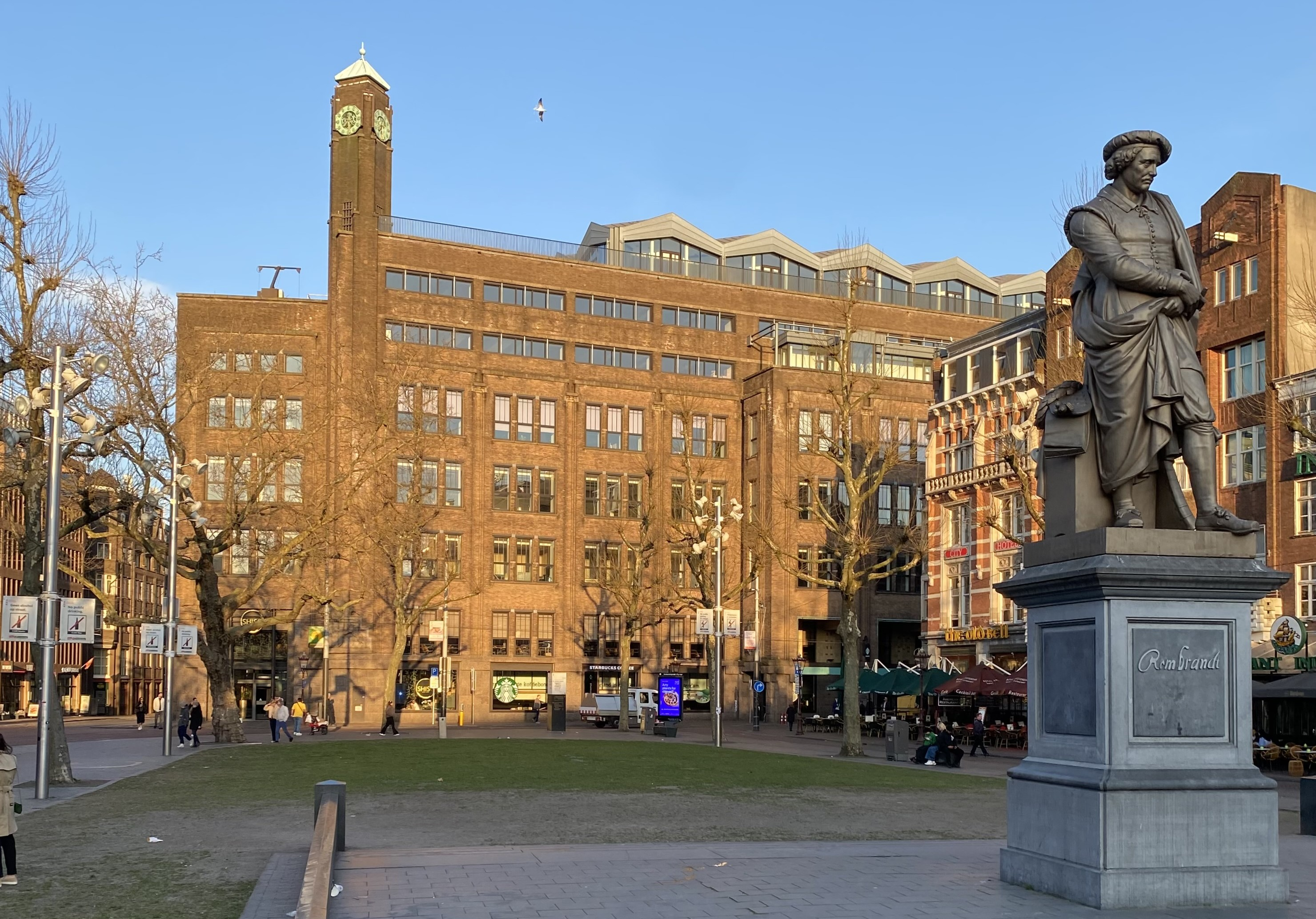
Former head office of Amsterdamsche Bank on Amsterdam's Rembrandtplein; lately headquarters of Booking.com

The Amsterdamsche Bank was a significant bank in the Netherlands, founded in 1871. In 1964, it merged with Rotterdamsche Bank to form AMRO Bank (for AMsterdamsche & ROtterdamsche).

== Overview ==
Amsterdamsche Bank was established on 5 December 1871 by a group of mainly German investors led by the Bank für Handel und Industrie (Darmstadt), in the context of German financial expansion following its victory of the Franco-Prussian War. It expanded rapidly from its base in Amsterdam to other cities in the Netherlands. In 1948 it took over Incasso Bank (est. 1891), which it fully absorbed in 1956.

Its elegant Art Nouveau head office building on Herengracht 597–601, designed by Eduard Cuypers and completed in 1897, was demolished in 1966. A subsequent head office building on Rembrandtplein, designed by Bert Johan Ouëndag and completed in 1932, is a notable Art Deco landmark of Amsterdam.

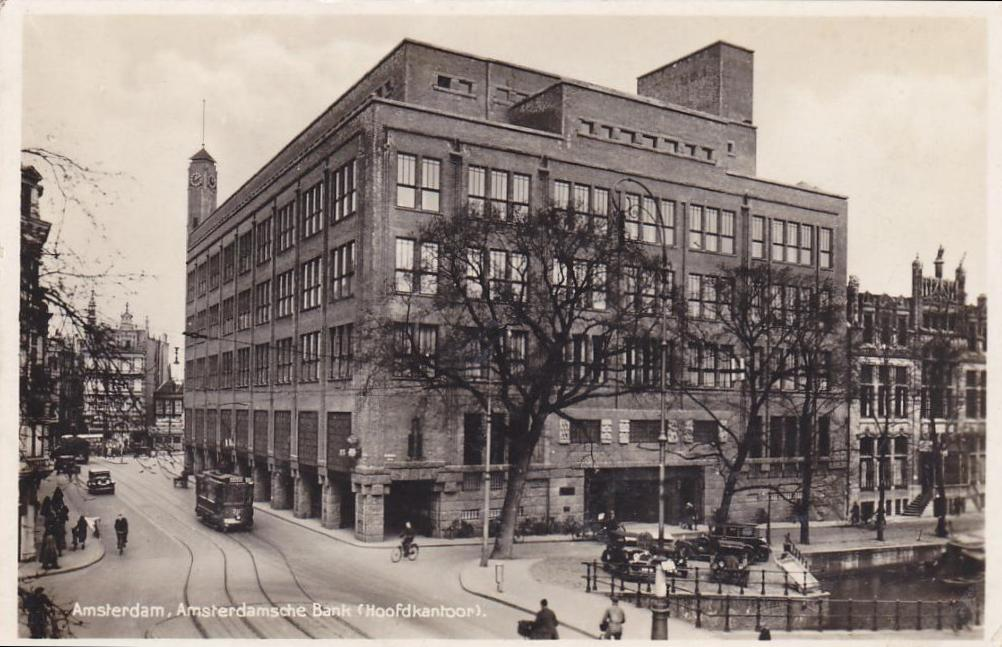
Amsterdamsche Bank head office, ca. 1932

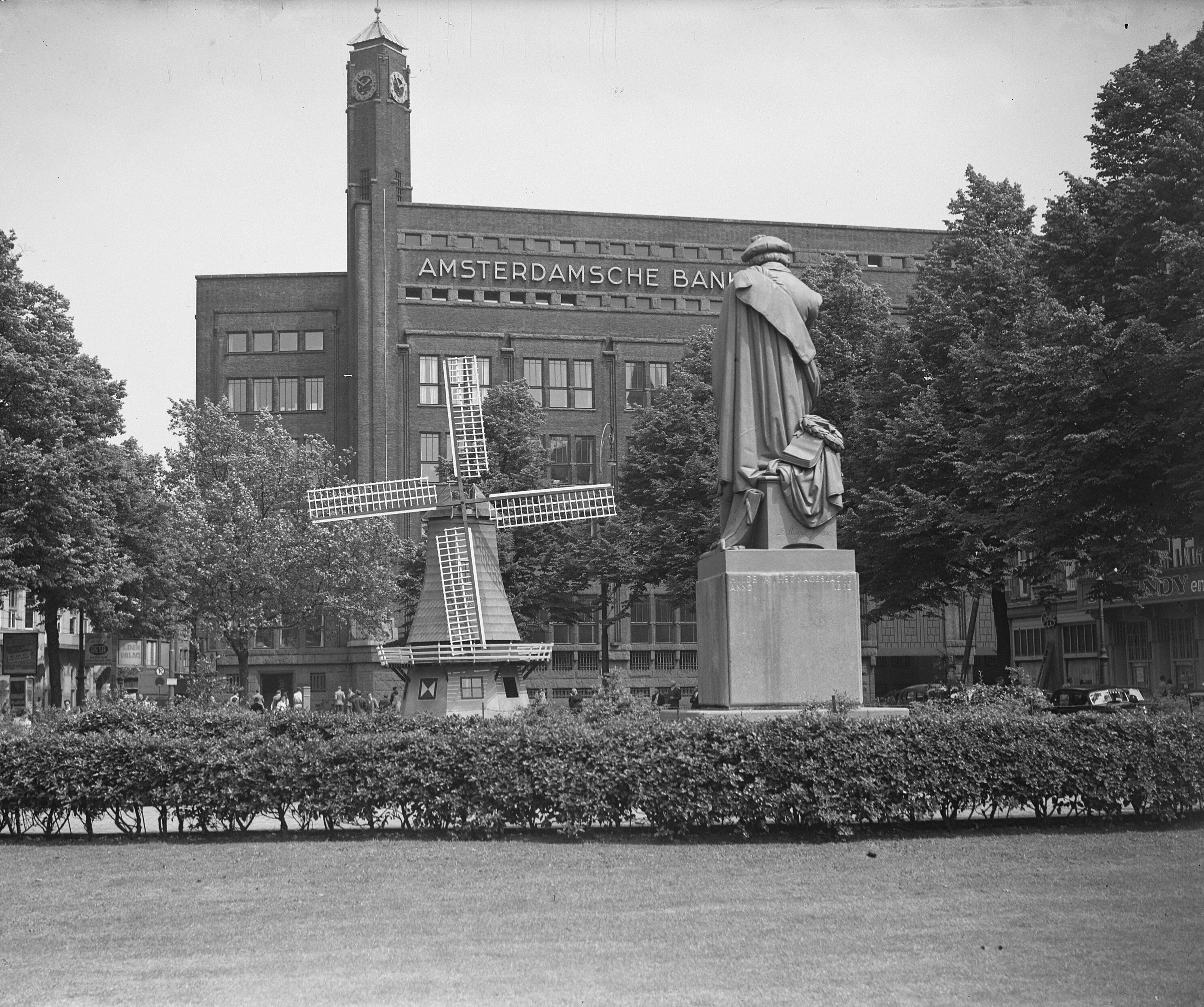
Head office viewed from Rembrandtplein, 1950

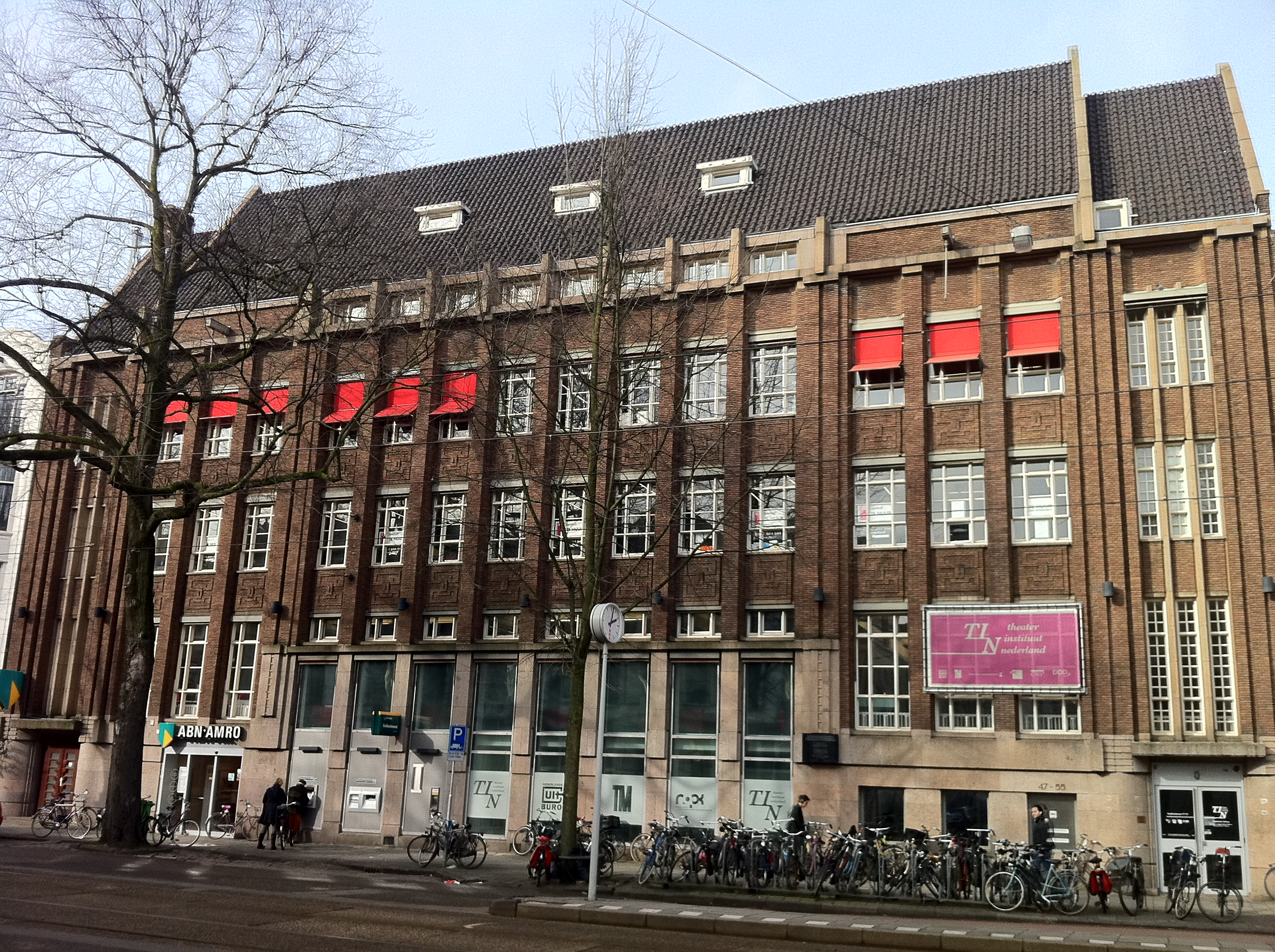
Former Amsterdamsche Bank branch on Sarphatistraat, previously the office of Lippmann, Rosenthal & Co.

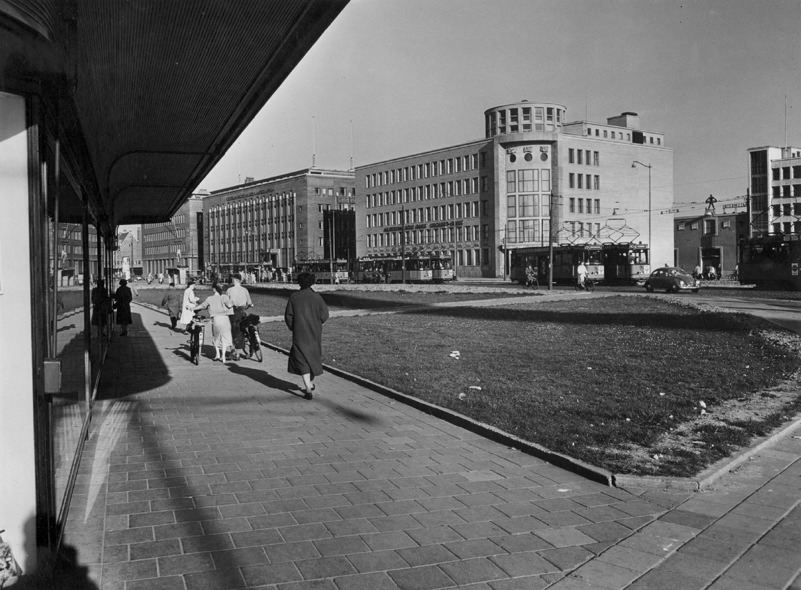
The adjacent buildings of Twentsche Bank (left), Netherlands Trading Society, and Amsterdamsche Bank (right) on the Blaak in Rotterdam, 1953

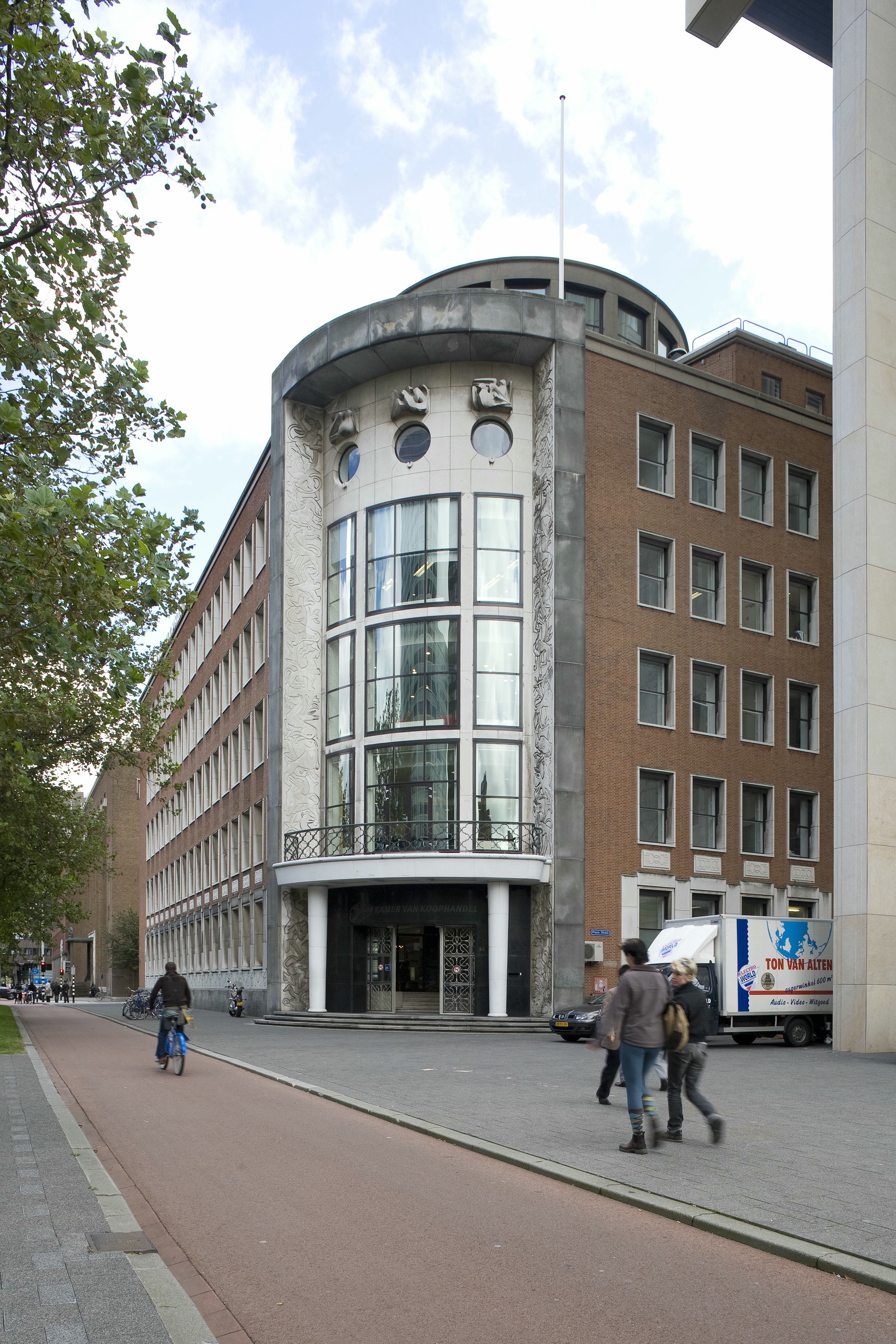
Former Amsterdamsche Incasso Bank building at Blaak 40, later Kamer van Koophandel Rotterdam, built in 1950

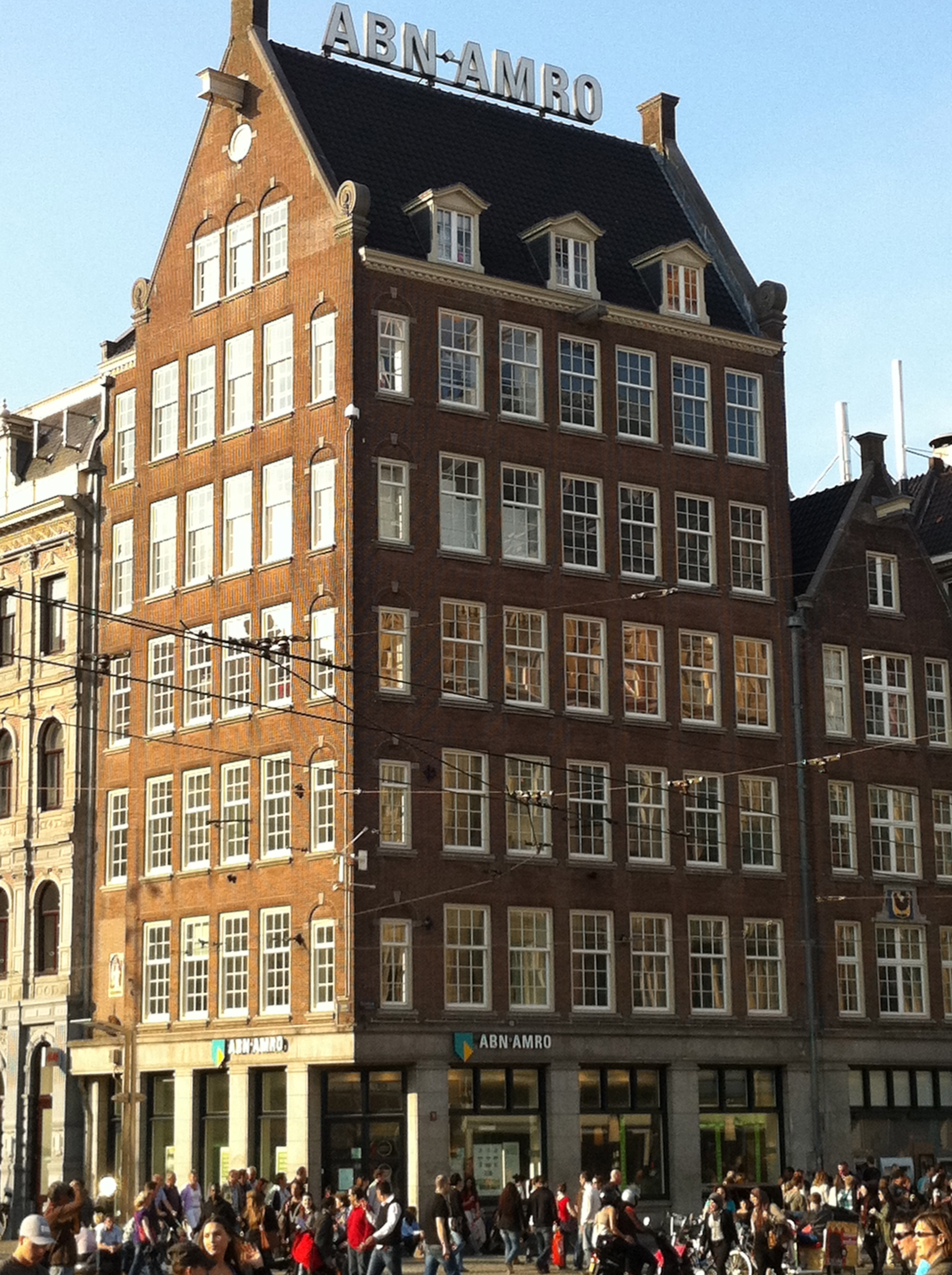
Former Incasso Bank building known as De Bisschop, designed by Jan Gratama and built in 1934 at the corner of Dam Square and Damrak in Amsterdam

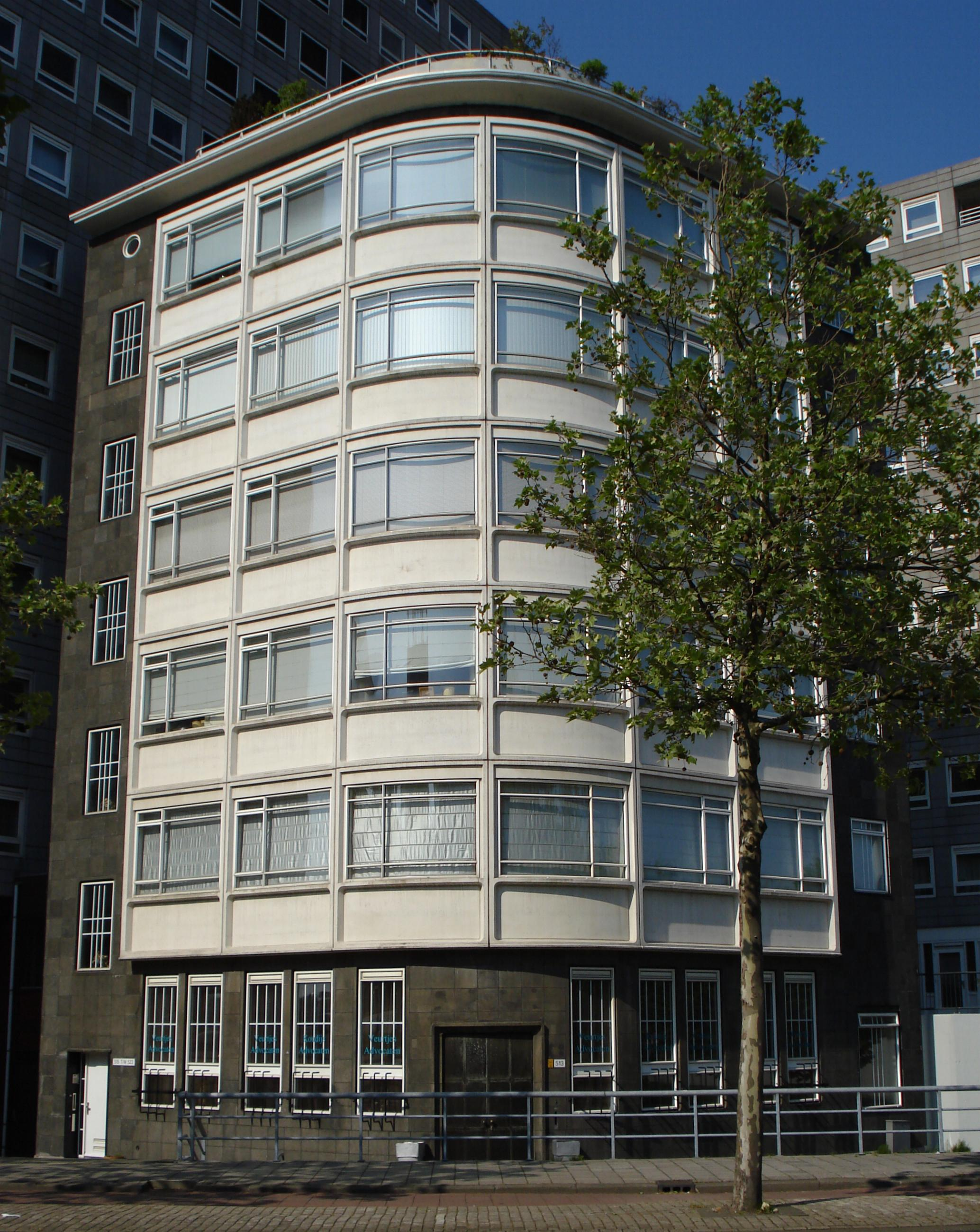
Former Incasso Bank building in Rotterdam

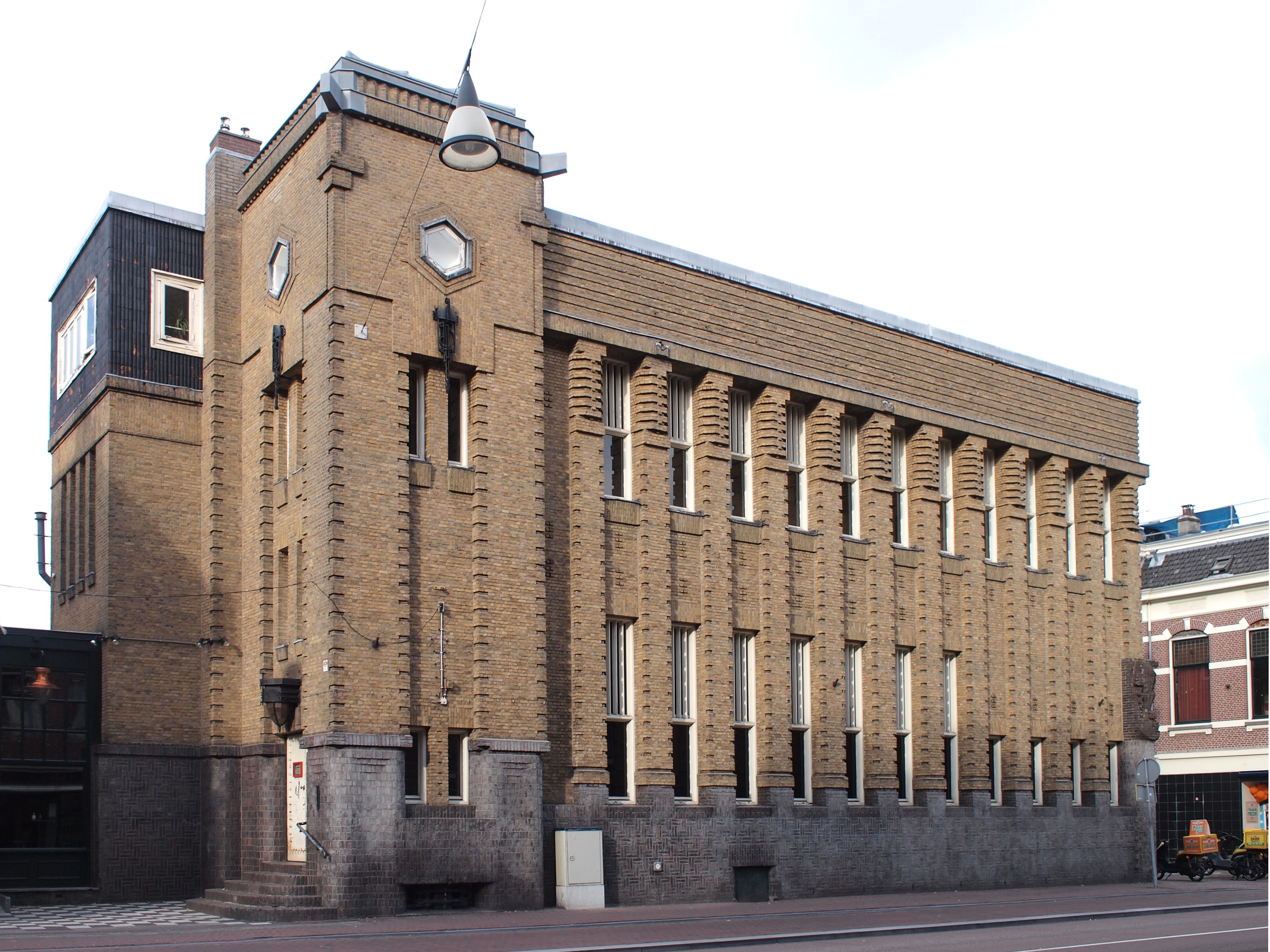
Former Incasso Bank building in Utrecht

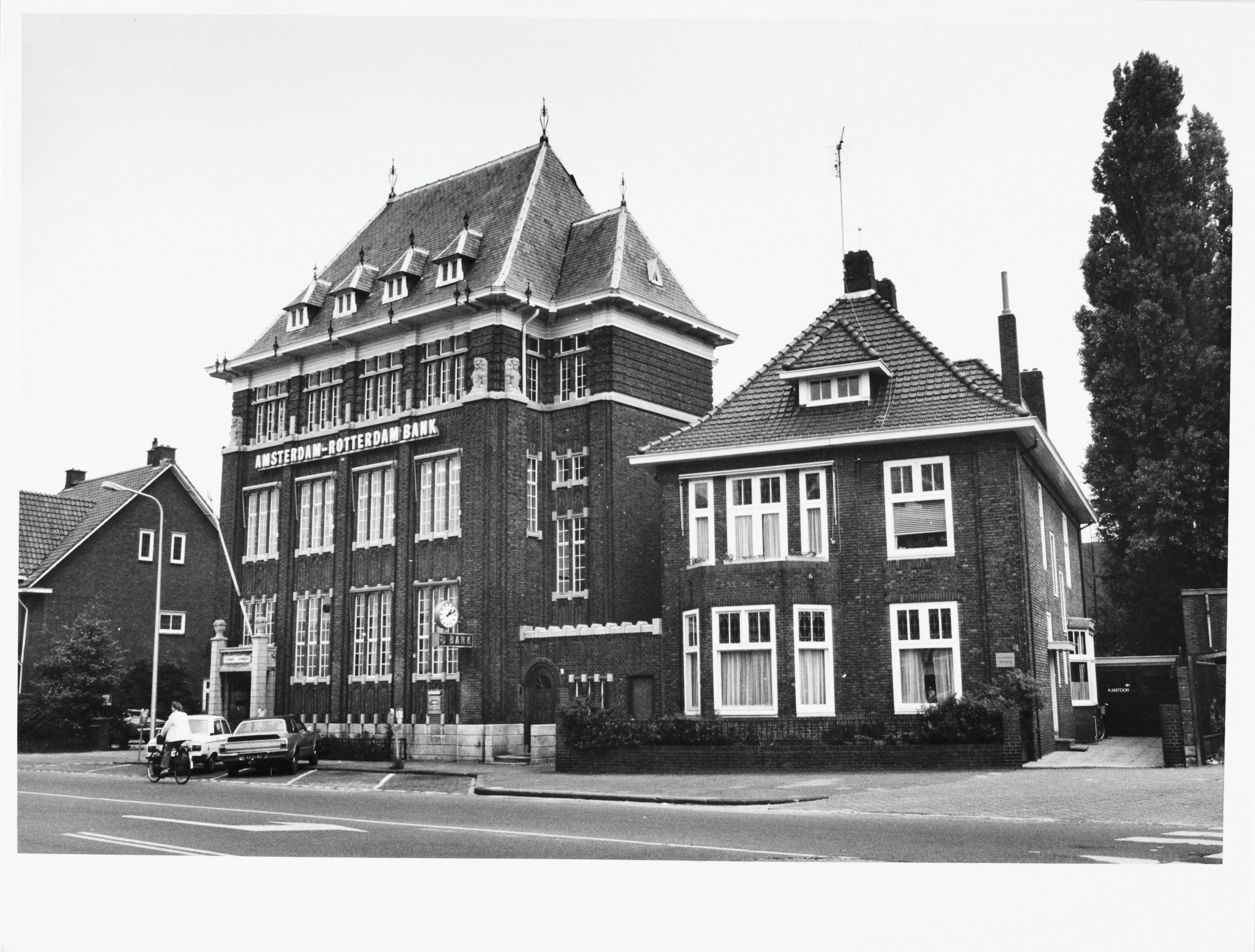
Former Incasso Bank building in Enschede, photographed in 1980

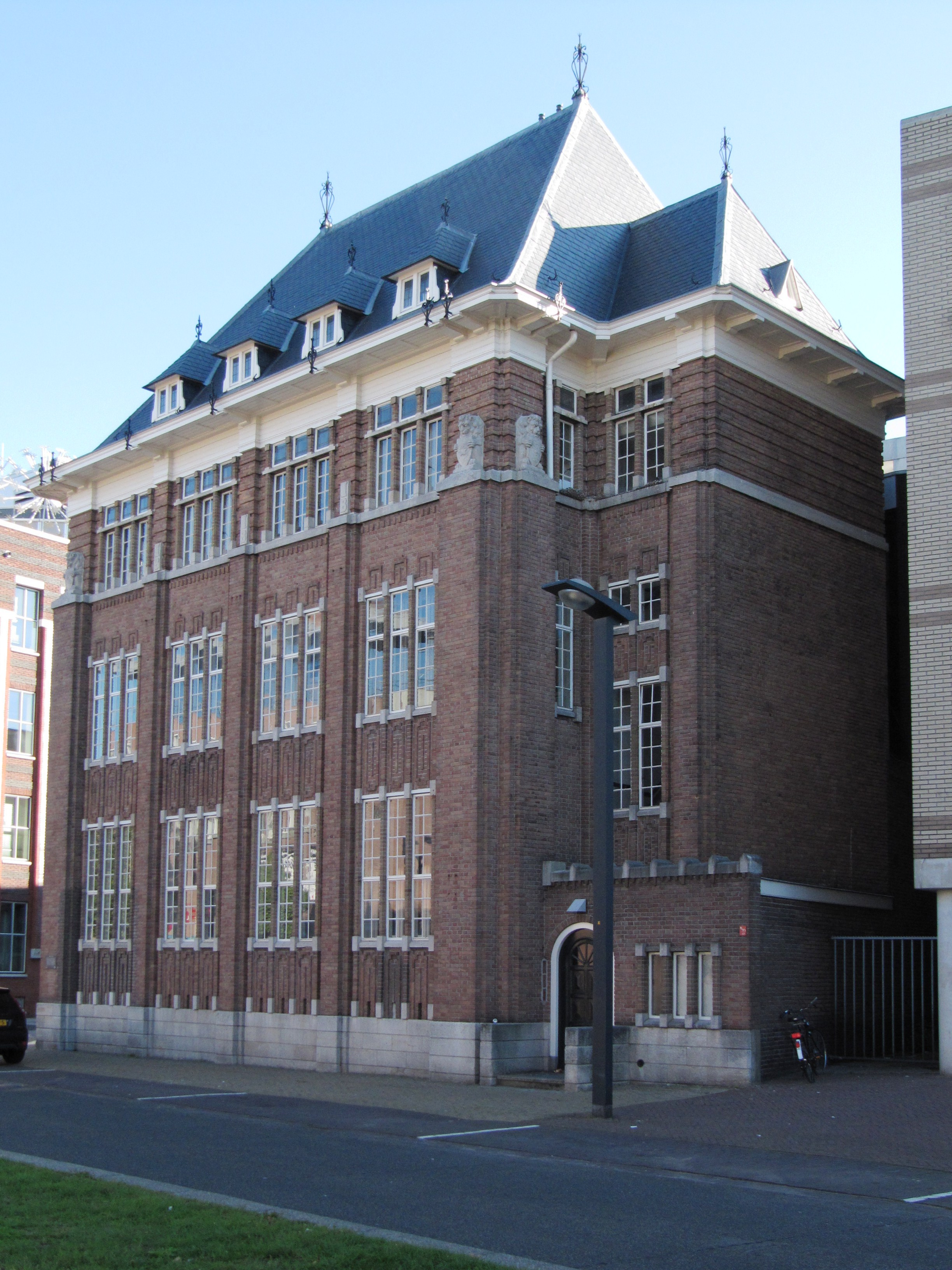
The same building in 2010

== See also ==
- Rabobank
- List of banks in the Netherlands
