= AMRO Bank =

Former Dutch bank

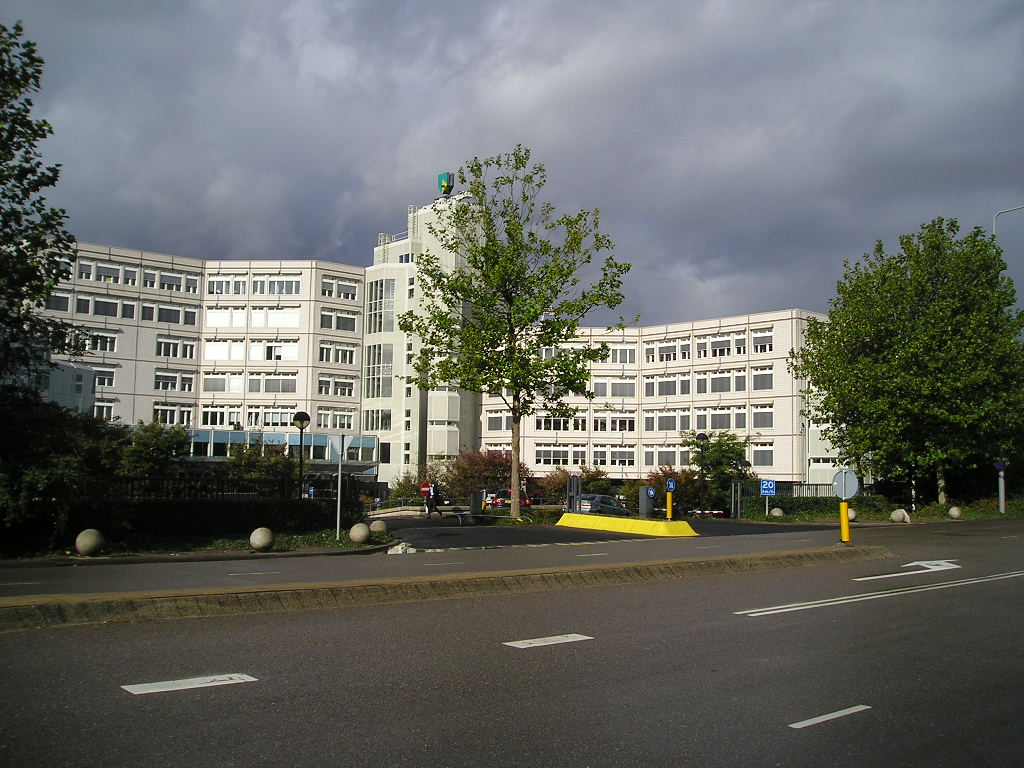
- Head office of AMRO in southeast Amsterdam, inaugurated in 1987
- Industry: Financial services
- Founded: 1964; 62 years ago
- Defunct: 1991
- Fate: Merged with ABN
- Successor: ABN AMRO
- Headquarters: Amsterdam, Netherlands
- Products: Asset management Commercial banking Investment banking Private banking Retail banking
- Parent: ABN AMRO

The Amsterdamsche en Rotterdamsche Bank (AMRO Bank, lit. 'Bank of Amsterdam and Rotterdam') was a major Dutch bank that was created in 1964 by the merger of the Amsterdamsche Bank (est. 1871) and the Rotterdamsche Bank (est. 1863). In 1991, it merged with Algemene Bank Nederland (ABN) to form ABN AMRO.

== History ==
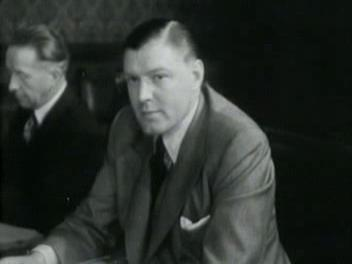
Statesman Jan van den Brink was instrumental in the merger of Amsterdamsche Bank and Rotterdamsche Bank in 1964, and remained on the bank's board until 1978

As early as 1939, there had been plans to merge the two banks but the banks shelved these plans in anticipation of Dutch involvement in World War II. The two banks announced their merger on 11 June 1964, and were integrated during the following year.

As soon as the AMRO Bank was set up, it set about gaining market share in business lending, leasing and factoring as well as in medium to long term credit. To do this it established the Nationale Bank voor Middellang Krediet business unit to provide medium to long term credit. It established or acquired companies such as Mahuko (Society for leasing) and Amstel Lease for its leasing business. The financing of factoring was brought together under the International Factors Nederland B.V., the oldest factoring company in the Netherlands.

In the 1960s and 1970s, like many other banking companies, AMRO saw growth in retail banking and this became a much bigger part of the business. Its wholesale banking was also strengthened by the acquisition of Pierson, Heldring & Pierson (PHP) in 1975. AMRO operated PHP as an independent unit under its existing name. Another acquisition was Utrecht based Bank Flaors & Ko, which had been in existence since 1691. This bank was absorbed under the AMRO Bank brand.

In 1967, AMRO Bank was one of the founders of the consortium bank Banque Européenne de Crédit à Moyen Terme (European bank of long term credit) based in Belgium. The aim was create an entity that was large enough to work at an international level.

Soon after this, with their sights on European integration, AMRO Bank announced plans to collaborate with Belgian Generale Bank with the aim of building a European international bank. However, this project was too ambitious and never managed to get off the ground.

It was only when the Dutch Government announced that it was relaxing its merger rules for financial institutions that ABN and AMRO Bank were able to seize the opportunity to merge and to create a bank large enough to fulfill these ambitions. On 24 August 1990, ABN AMRO was created by the conversion of the shares of both banks into shares of the newly established ABN AMRO Holding N.V.

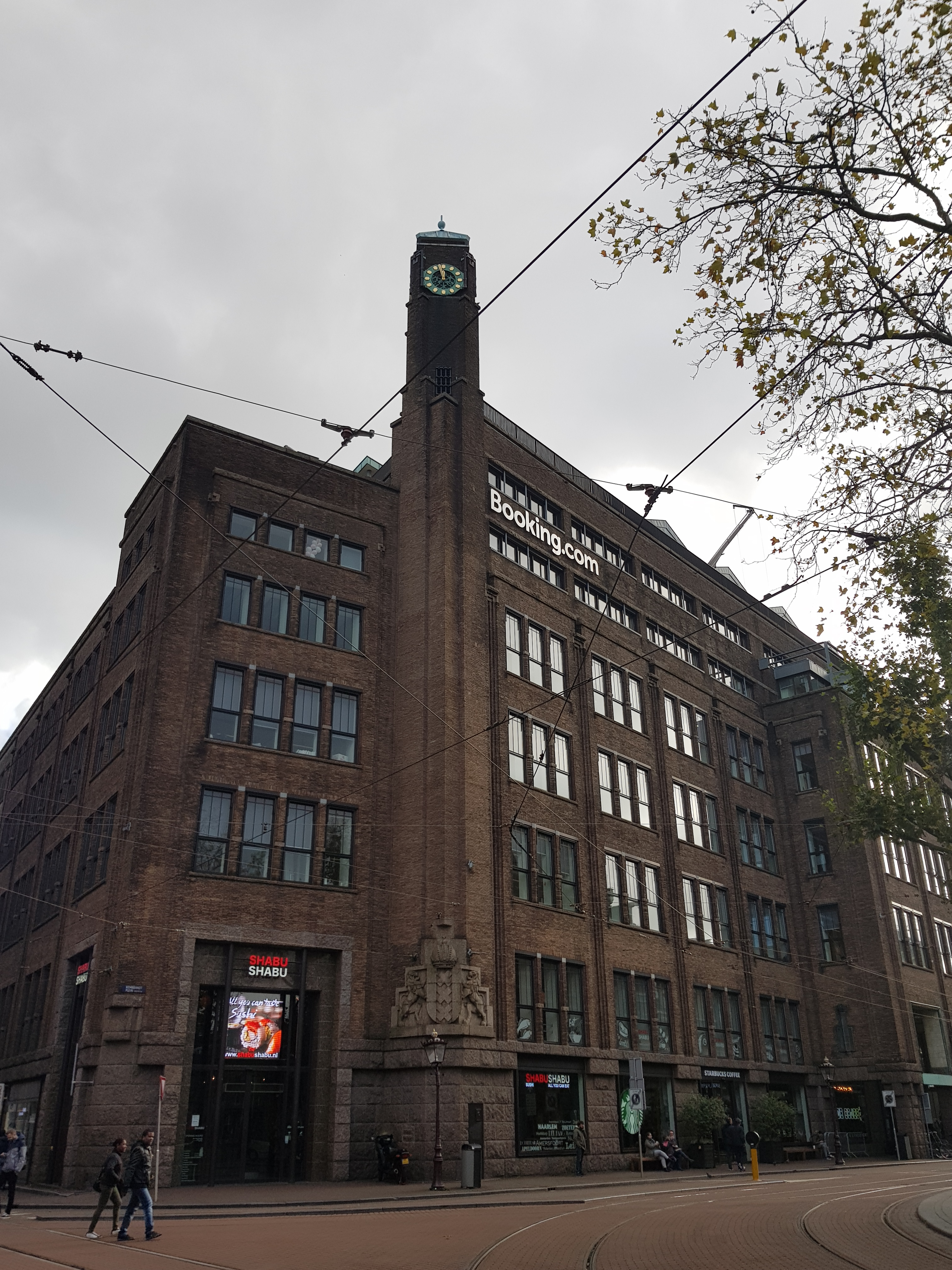
Amsterdam head office before 1987, lately headquarters of Booking.com

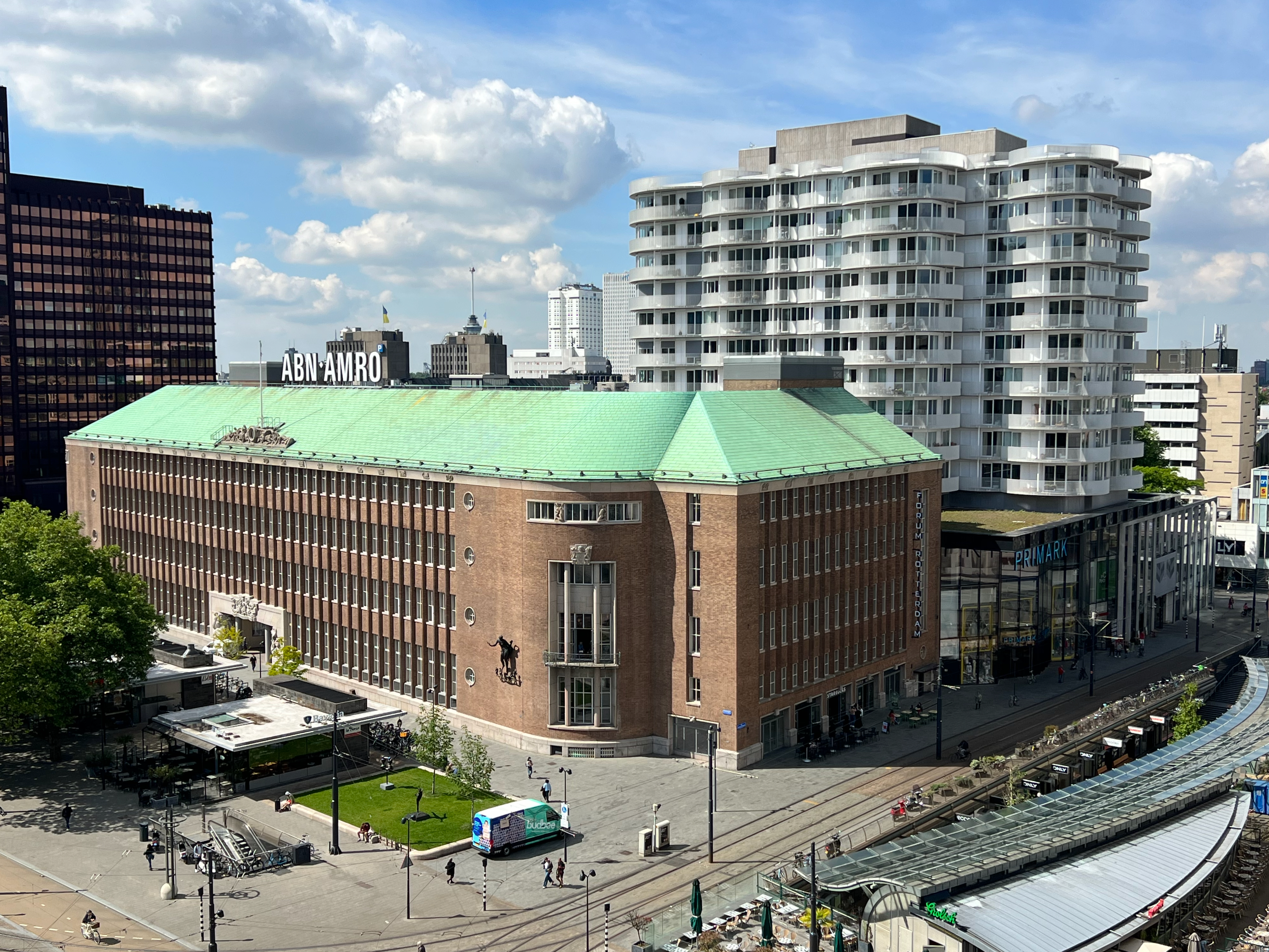
Rotterdam head office, later repurposed as a shopping center

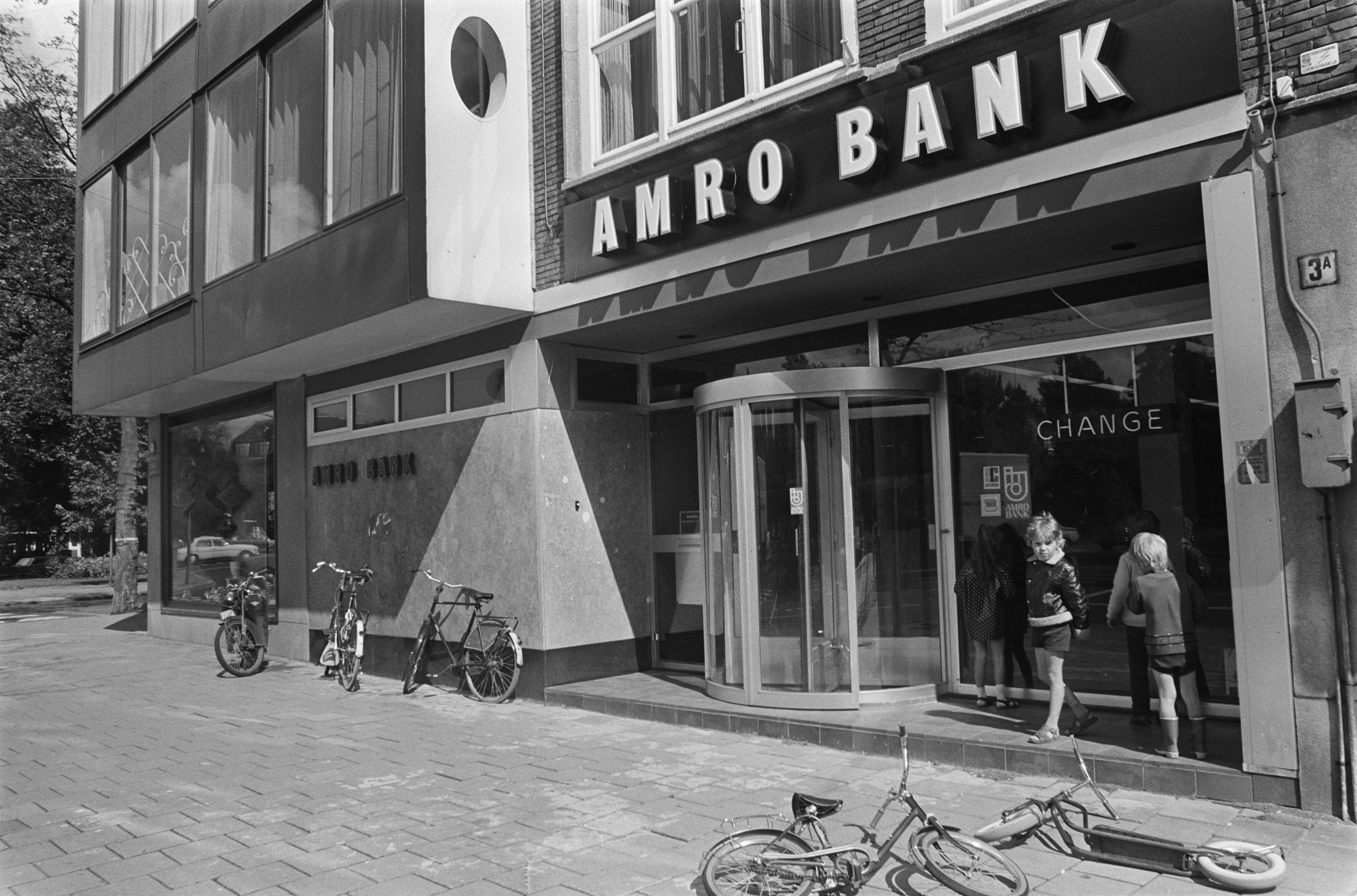
Beethovenstraat branch in Amsterdam, 1970

== See also ==
- Rabobank
- List of banks in the Netherlands
