= Jenks =

Jenks may refer to:

== Places ==
- Holland Jenks House, Florida
- Jenks Lake, California
- Jenks, Oklahoma
  - Jenks Public Schools, a public school system located in Jenks, Oklahoma
- Jenks, West Virginia
- Jenks Township, Forest County, Pennsylvania
- John Story Jenks School, a school located in Pennsylvania
- Jenkinson's Boardwalk, colloquially called Jenk's, a boardwalk and amusement park in Point Pleasant beach, New Jersey

== People ==
- Denis "Jenks" Jenkinson, motor racing journalist
- Alden Jenks (born 1940), American composer
- Andrew Jenks, American filmmaker
- Arthur Whipple Jenks, Christian theologian
- Bobby Jenks, professional baseball player
- Cynthia Jenks, American physical chemist
- Daisy Jenks, English videographer
- Frank Jenks, actor
- Frederick L. Jenks, professor emeritus at Florida State University
- George A. Jenks, 19th-century Pennsylvania politician
- George C. Jenks, author of first The Shadow story under pen name Frank S. Lawton
- George F. Jenks, 20th-century cartographer
  - Jenks natural breaks optimization, the data classification system he designed
- Gwladys Jenks, (born 1920) Casting Director for Thames Television
- Jeremiah Jenks, professor
- Maurice Jenks, 604th Lord Mayor of London
- Michael Hutchinson Jenks, 19th-century Pennsylvania politician
- Silvester Jenks, Catholic priest
- Stephen Jenks, composer
- William J. Jenks, 20th century railroad businessman

== Fictional characters ==
- Darryl Jenks, a character in the 1988 American romantic comedy film Coming to America

== See also ==
- Jencks (disambiguation)
- Jenckes, a surname
