= Jenckes =

Jenckes is a surname. Notable people with the surname include:

- Joseph Jenckes (disambiguation), three prominent early New England colonists
- Marcien Jenckes, the chief executive officer for Voxant, Inc, a new media company in Reston, Virginia
- Thomas Jenckes (1818–1875), United States Congressional representative for the State of Rhode Island
- Virginia E. Jenckes (1877–1975), U.S. Representative from Indiana

== See also ==
- E. N. Jenckes Store, historic store on Main Street in Douglas, Massachusetts
- Jenckes House (Old Louisquisset Pike, Lincoln, Rhode Island), historic house
- Jenckes Mansion, historic house at 837 Social Street, Woonsocket, Rhode Island
- Whipple-Jenckes House (Liberty Jenckes House), historic American Colonial house at 2500 Diamond Hill Road, Cumberland, Rhode Island
- Jencks (disambiguation)
