= Kennell =

Kennell is a surname and occasional given name. Notable people with the name include:

- John H. Kennell (1922–2013), American doctor and researcher
- Kari Kennell (born 1964), American model and actress
- Patrick C. Kennell (born 1960), American university director of English studies
- Kennell Jackson Jr. (1941–2005), African-American expert on East Africa

== See also ==
- Kennel, a shelter for dogs
- John McKennell (1929–2009), Canadian ice hockey player
