= Jenckes House =

Jenckes House may refer to either of two houses in the U.S. state of Rhode Island, both of which are listed on the National Register of Historic Places:

- Jenckes House (Jenckes Hill Road, Lincoln, Rhode Island)
- Jenckes House (Old Louisquisset Pike, Lincoln, Rhode Island)

== See also ==
- Jenckes Mansion
