= Arthur Jenks =

Arthur Jenks may refer to:

- Arthur B. Jenks (1866–1947), U.S. Representative from New Hampshire
- Arthur Whipple Jenks (1863–1922), American Episcopal theologian
