= Charles Arthur Conant =

American journalist and writer

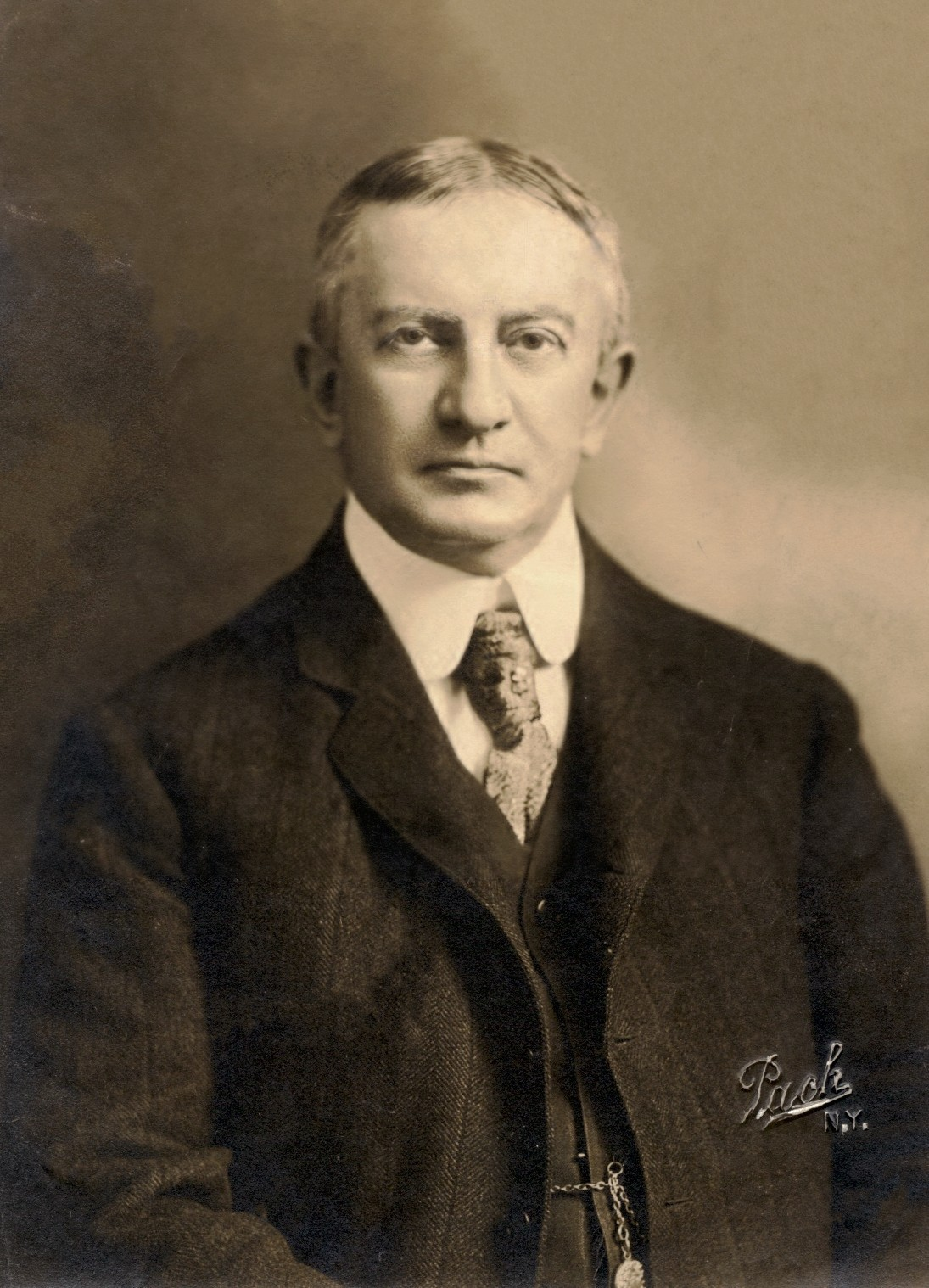
Charles Arthur Conant

Charles Arthur Conant (July 2, 1861 – July 5, 1915) was an American journalist, author, and promoter who became recognized as an expert on banking and finance.

Conant was descended from one of the earliest New England settlers (Roger Conant) and was born in Winchester, Massachusetts. He studied in public schools and with private tutors, and between 1889 and 1901 was the correspondent in Washington, D.C., for the New York Journal of Commerce and Commercial Bulletin.

In 1901–1902 he was in the Philippines, sent by secretary of war Elihu Root to investigate coinage and banking, on a commission organized by the U.S. Secretary of War. According to Murray N. Rothbard the ultimate purpose of the work in the Philippines was to remove Mexican silver currency, which was used on a large scale in Asia, from circulation He returned to take a positions as treasurer of the Morton Trust Company of New York where he specialized in overseas banking. In 1915 Elihu Root sent him to Cuba, but he died of a fever there. His work as a so-called money doctor was continued by Edwin W. Kemmerer.

== Work ==
After the United States' venture into a war against Spain, Conant participated actively both in advertising to the American public and in the administration of the colonial financial system, both in the Philippines and in Central America. Conant's most important work consists of journal articles collected in The United States and the Orient, in which he argued, before John A. Hobson and Vladimir Lenin, which took a moral perspective into the theory, that imperialism was a natural and necessary outgrowth of capitalism. In reviews of the book Conant's argument was summarized as follows: (1) "In all advanced countries there has been such excessive saving that no profitable investment for capital remains", (2) since all countries do not practice a policy of commercial freedom, "America must be prepared to use force if necessary" to open up profitable investment outlets abroad, and (3) "Only by the firm hand of the responsible governing races....can the assurance of uninterrupted progress be conveyed to the tropical and undeveloped countries".

Conant also attempted to articulate the economic utility of speculation on organized stock exchanges. In essays that were collected in the book "Wall Street and the Country, "He argued, in what is a familiar formulation today, that stock prices reflect all of the information available about a corporation, economic conditions, etc., and that those prices were thus a measure of a stock's "true value." The trends of the market, he concluded, were an indication of where the nation's capital could most profitably be invested. His main caveat was that pure gambling by uninformed speculators could hurt the market's ability to reflect true values. He urged that speculation only be carried on by experienced investors with the ability to understand and process complex financial and economic information.

He wrote many articles for periodicals and encyclopaedias on American and on Latin-American finance and trade, collected and published in:

- A History of Modern Banks of Issue (1896; fourth edition, 1909)
- The United States in the Orient: The Nature of an Economic Problem (1900)
- Alexander Hamilton (1901)
- Wall Street and the Country (1904)
- The Principles of Money and Banking (1905)

== Legacy ==
The coinage system used in the Philippines during the American occupation was called the Conant series in his honor.
