= Gerard Vissering =

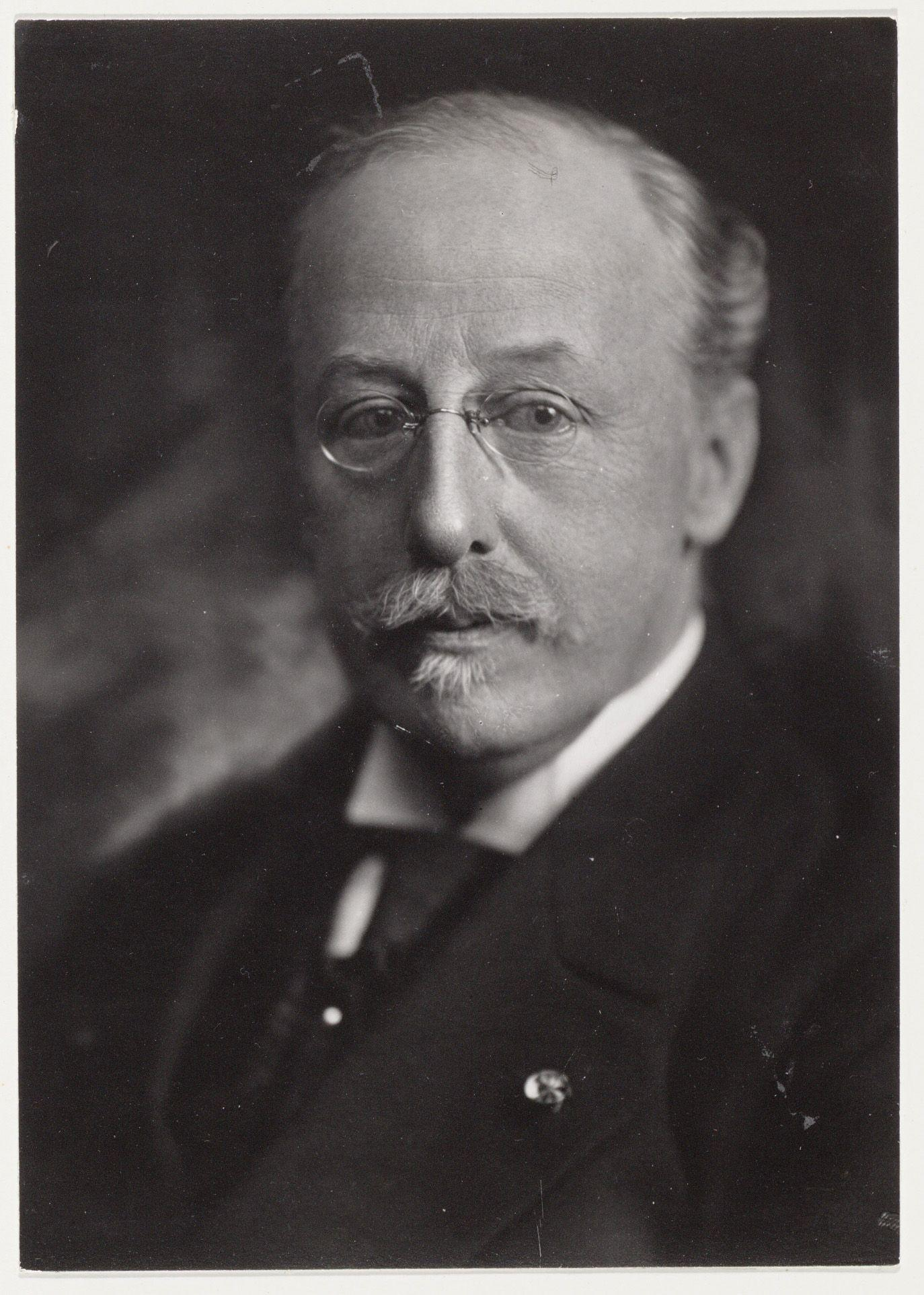
Photograph of Gerard Vissering by Jacob Merkelbach

Gerard Vissering (1 March 1865 – 19 December 1937) was a Dutch banker.

Gerard Vissering was born in Leiden, Netherlands. He was the son of finance minister Simon Vissering (1818-1888) and Grietje Corver (1825-1898). After graduating from school he worked briefly as a lawyer, before becoming a banker. From 1906 till 1912, he was the president of the Bank of Java. From 1912 till 1931, he was the president of De Nederlandsche Bank.

In the period between 1919 and 1937, he was a member and vice-chairman of the Zuiderzeeraad in the Netherlands. He was also chairman of the state commission on studying the issue of the Zuiderzee grounds.

In 1928, having been invited to Turkey, he helped the Central Bank of Turkey with a report highlighting the necessity of an independent central bank not to be affiliated to the government.

== See also ==
- Money doctor
