= Bank of Java =

Bank in Netherlands East Indies and Indonesia

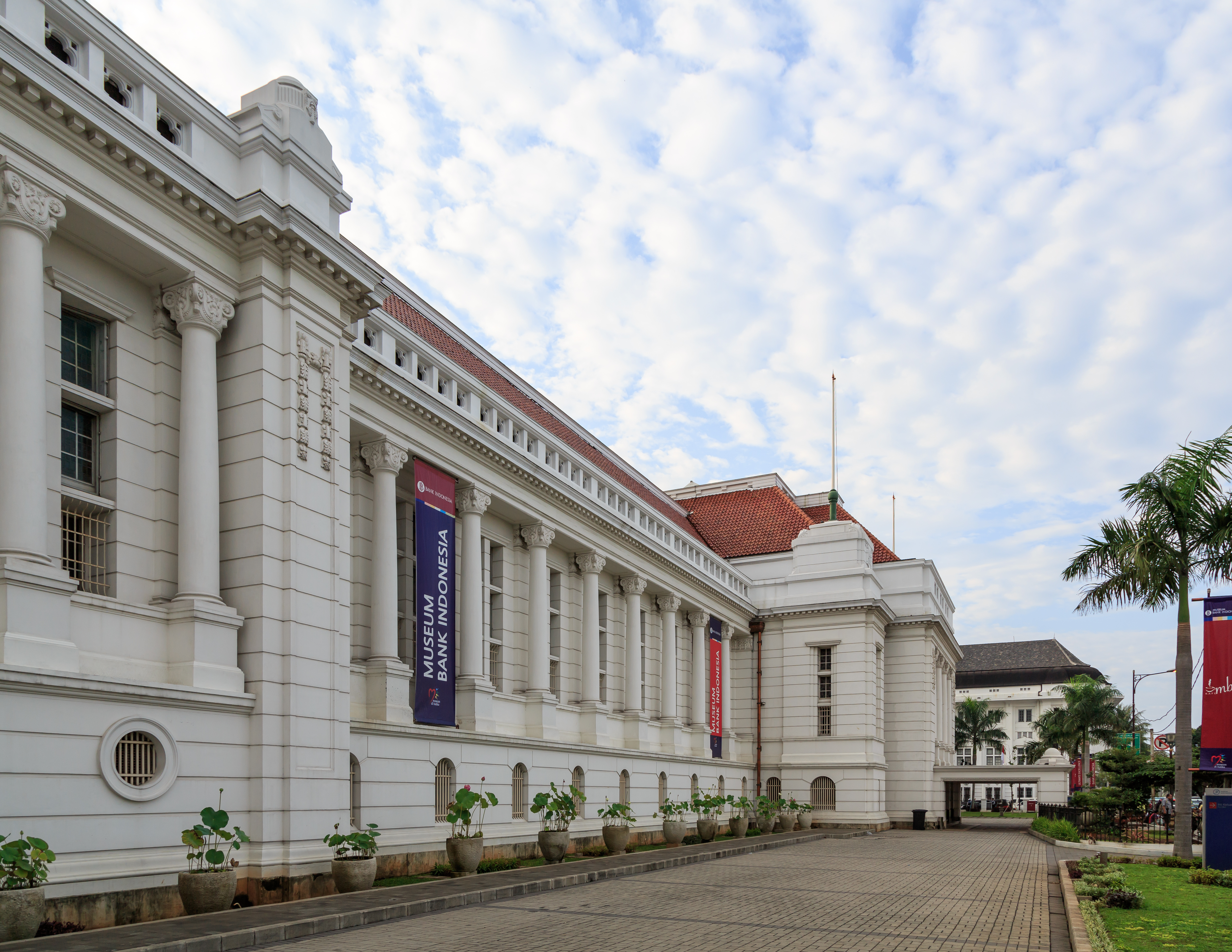
Former head office of the Bank of Java in Batavia, now Bank Indonesia Museum in Jakarta

The Bank of Java (Dutch: De Javasche Bank N.V., abbreviated as DJB) was a note-issuing bank in the Dutch East Indies, founded in 1828, and nationalized in 1951 by the government of Indonesia to become the newly independent country’s central bank, later renamed Bank Indonesia. For more than a century, the Bank of Java was the central institution of the Dutch East Indies’ financial system, alongside the “big three” commercial banks (the Netherlands Trading Society, the Nederlandsch-Indische Handelsbank, and the Nederlandsch-Indische Escompto Maatschappij). It was both a note-issuing bank and a commercial bank.

== Background ==
The first bank founded in the Indonesian archipelago was the Bank van Courant, established in 1746, to support trading activity. In 1752, it was renamed De Bank van Courant en Bank Van Leening (lit. 'Bank of current [accounts] and loans'), and was given a mandate to extend loans to employees of the Dutch East India Company. In 1818, that institution closed as a consequence of financial crisis.

== Dutch colonial period ==
King William I of the Netherlands granted the right to create a private bank in the Indies in 1826, which was named De Javasche Bank. It was founded on 24 January 1828, and later became the bank of issue of the Dutch East Indies, issuing and regulating the Netherlands Indies gulden.

In 1829, it opened branch offices in Semarang and Surabaya. Later branch offices opened in Padang (1864), Makassar (1864), Cirebon (1866), Solo (1867), Pasuruan (1867), Yogyakarta (1879), Pontianak (1906), Bengkalis (1907), Medan (1907), Banjarmasin (1907), Tanjungbalai (1908), Tanjungpura (1908), Bandung (1909), Palembang (1909), Manado (1910), Malang (1916), Kutaraja / Banda Aceh (1918), Kediri (1923), Pematang Siantar (1923), and Madiun (1928).

Until 1891, the DJB was represented in the mainland Netherlands by the Netherlands Trading Society. That year, it opened an office in Amsterdam, which in 1922 was converted into a subsidiary known as Bijbank Javasche Bank or Javasche Bank Nederland. Some time later, DJB opened an office in New York.

Under the Japanese occupation of the Dutch East Indies during World War II, the occupation authorities closed the Bank of Java and all other Dutch and Western banks in March 1942, and endeavored to seize as much as possible of their assets. They replaced it with an ad hoc central bank for occupied Indonesia, named Nanpo Kaihatsu Ginko (Japanese: 南方開発金庫, lit. 'Southern Development Bank'). The Bank of Java could only reopen after the surrender of Japan in the late summer of 1945.

== Nationalization and aftermath ==
The Bank of Java was nationalized by the Sukarno government in 1951, and renamed Bank Indonesia on 1 July 1953. By that time, Europeans still represented four-fifths of the Bank's employees.

In 1962, Bank Indonesia moved to a new head office building. Its former main building on Station Square in Jakarta was left to deteriorate. It was renovated in the 2000s, and repurposed as Bank Indonesia Museum, which opened on 21 July 2009.

In 1966, the bank's affiliate in Amsterdam became the Indonesian Overseas Bank, later renamed the Indover Bank. It was eventually liquidated in 2008.

== Leadership ==
Presidents of the Bank of Java have included:

- Chr. de Haan (1828–1838)
- C.J. Smulders (1838–1851)
- Emanuel Francis (1851–1863)
- Carel Wiggers van Kerchem (1863–1868)
- J.W.C. Diepenheim (1868–1870)
- Fokko Alting Mees (1870–1873)
- Norbertus van den Berg (1873–1889)
- Sako Zeverijn (1889–1893)
- D. Groeneveld (1893–1898)
- J. Reijsenbach (1899–1906)
- Gerard Vissering (1906–1912)
- Ede Zeilinga (1912–1924)
- Leonardus Trip (1924–1929)
- Gerard van Buttingha Wichers (1929–1945)
- J.C. van Waveren (1946)
- R.E. Smits (1946–1949)
- Andre Houwink (1949–1951)
- Sjafruddin Prawiranegara (1951–1953)

== Buildings ==
Shortly after its founding, the Java Bank moved into a vacant hospital in Batavia's lower city. In 1913, a new building was added, designed by Amsterdam architect Eduard Cuypers. In 1924, the last hospital buildings were replaced by new ones designed by Eduard Cuypers, whose architecture echoed his earlier design. Cuypers' successors, the Fermont-Cuypers firm, extended in 1936 the 1913 building forward and added a new façade, around the main entrance The current extensive complex houses now the Museum Bank Indonesia on Station Square. The head offices of the three large banks were built on adjacent lots in the 1920s and 1930s, namely the Nederlandsch-Indische Escompto Maatschappij to the north, the Netherlands Trading Society to the south, and the Nederlandsch-Indische Handelsbank to the northeast. Between 1908 and 1927, a new bank building was built in cities as Banjarmasin, Bandung, Cirebon, Yogyakarta, Banda Aceh, Makassar, Malang, Medan, Manado, Padang , Palembang, Pematang Siantar, Semarang , Surabaya, Surakarta. These buildings were also designed by Eduard Cuypers, who collaborated with M.J. Hulswit (1862-1921) and A.A. Fermont (1882-1967) in Batavia. After the death of Eduard Cuypers, a few more buildings of the Javasche Bank were built, designed by the Fermont-Cuypers office, namely in; Pontianak, Kediri and Semarang.

The Amsterdam office was opened in 1891, at 60 Reguliersdwarsstraat, in a suite of offices hosted by the Hollandsche Hypotheekbank. It moved to Keizersgracht 668 in April 1892. In 1920, DJB expanded to the nearby building at Keizersgracht 664, and in 1937–1939, the bank erected a new office building on numbers 664-666, designed in 1936 by the architecture firm of Christiaan Posthumus Meyjes jr. and Jakob van der Linden. The successor entity, Indover Bank, remained there until 1992, when it moved to Stadhouderskade.

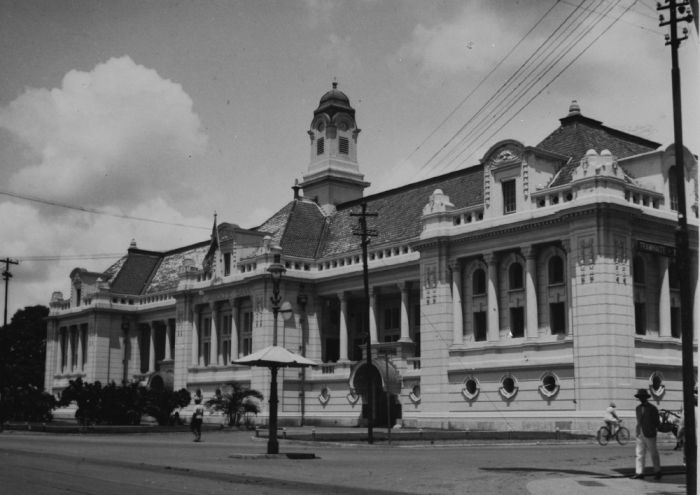
Head office in Batavia, before remodeling in 1936

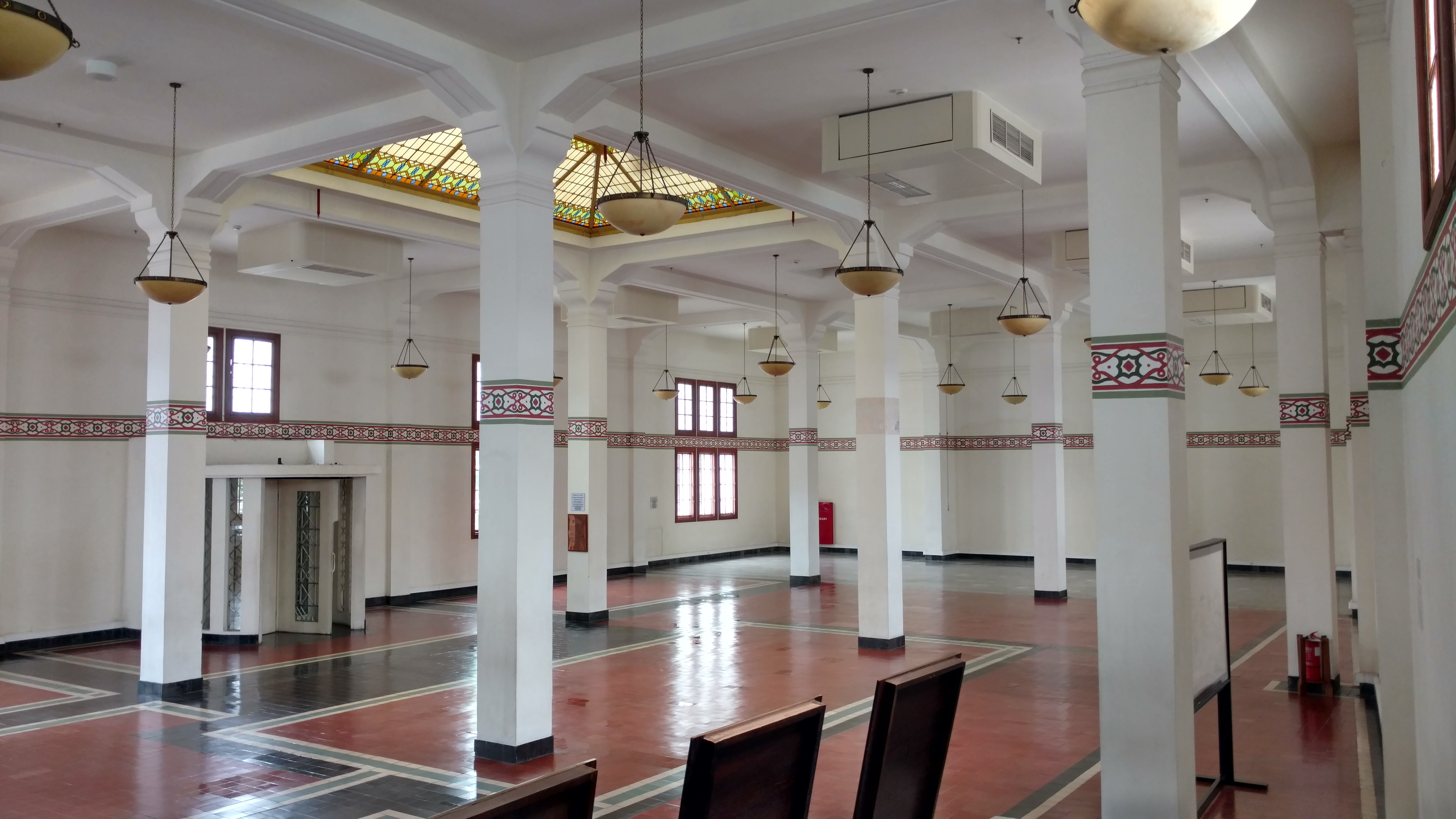
Interior hall of the branch in Surabaya (2016)

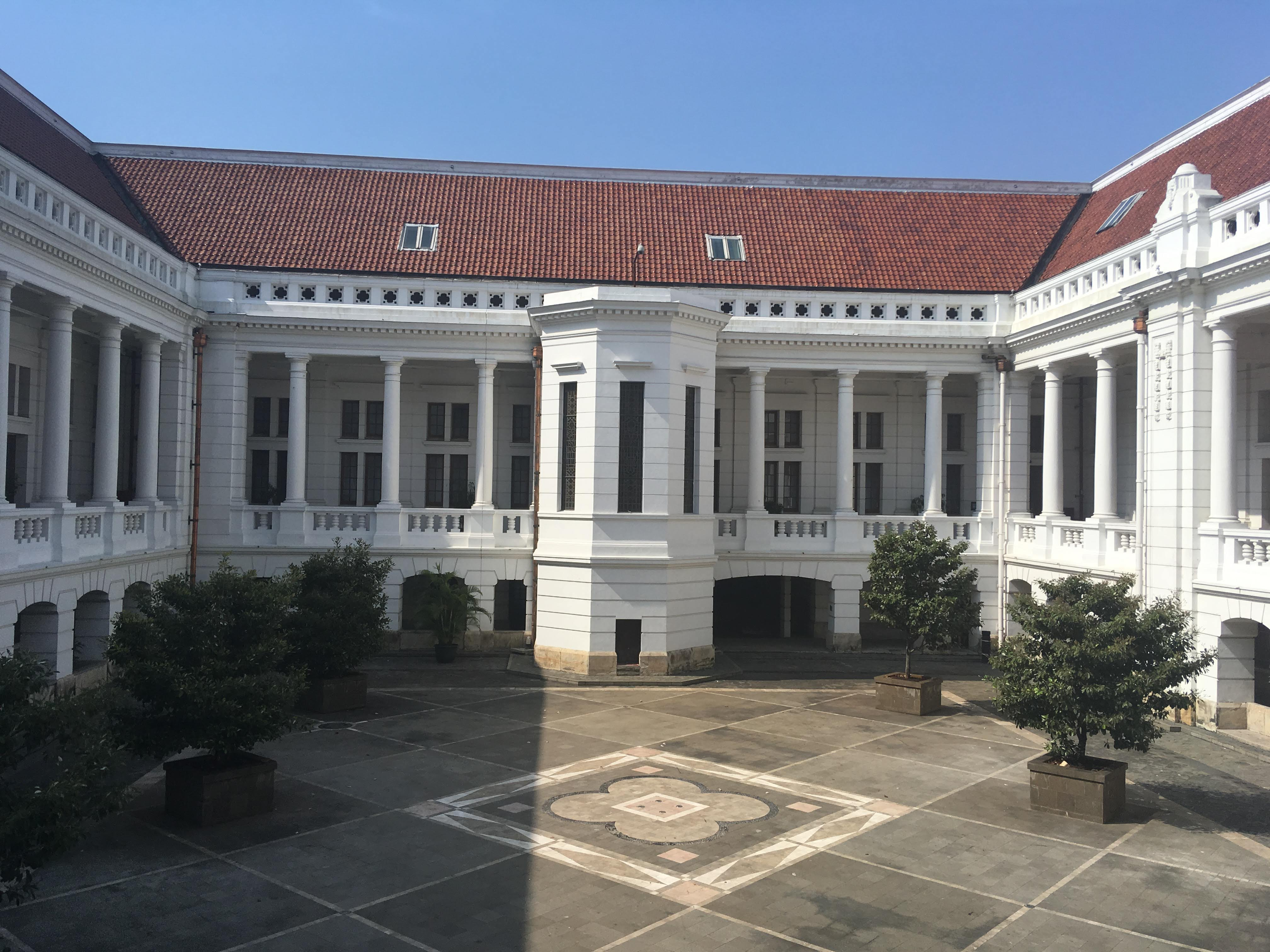
Inner court in Jakarta (2018)

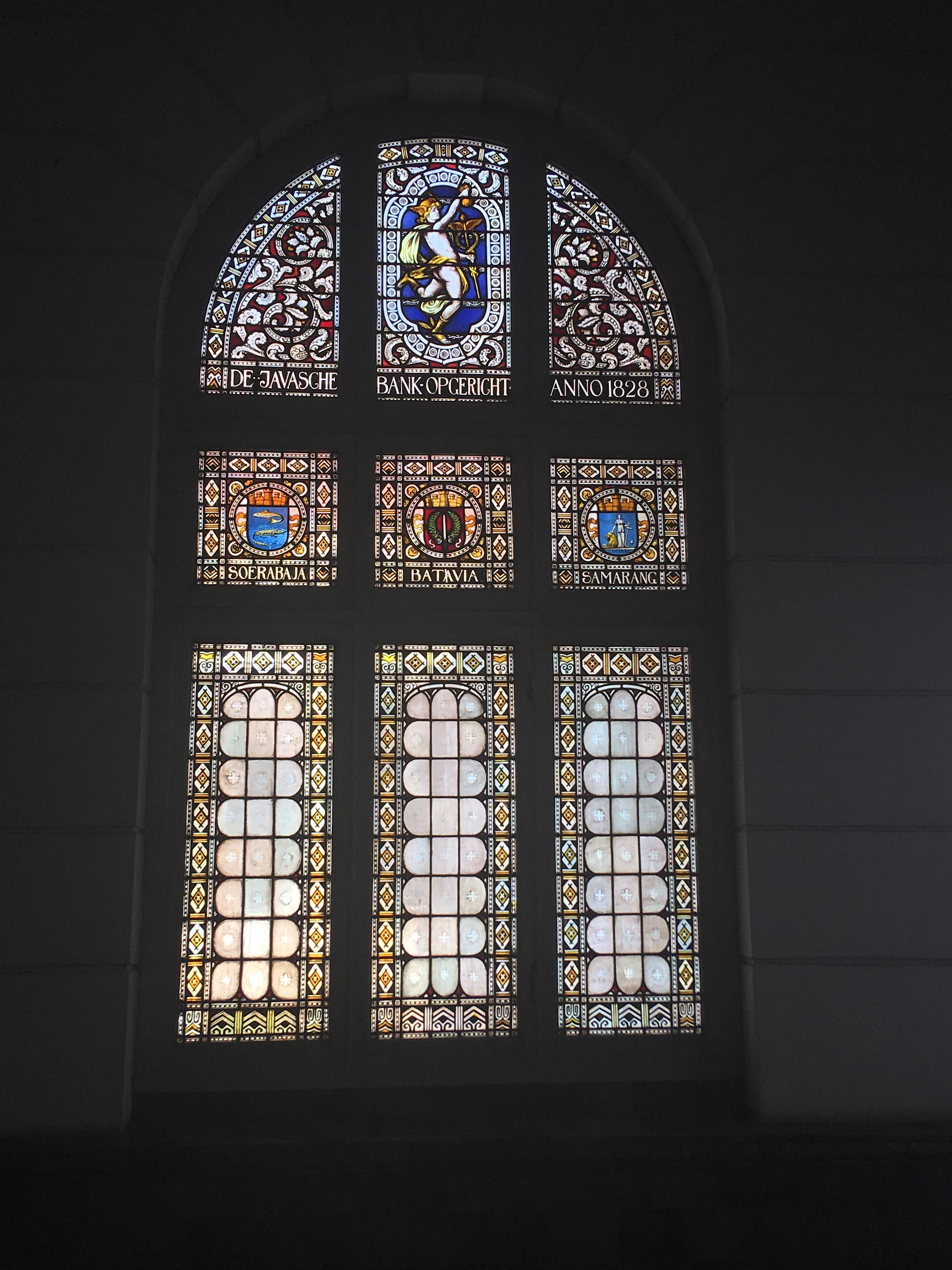
Stained glass window (2018)

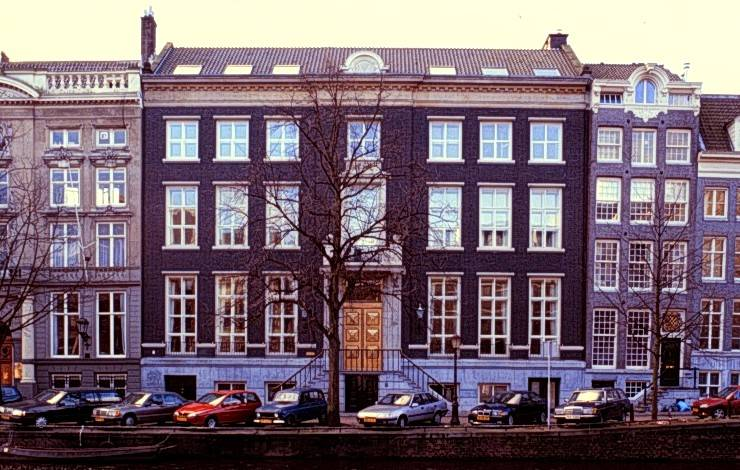
Keizersgracht 666-668, former office of the Bank of Java in Amsterdam

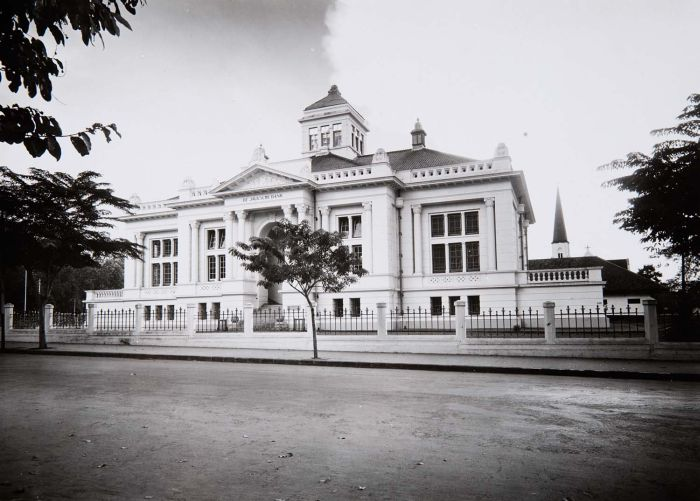
Branch office in Bandung, built in 1918; now a museum

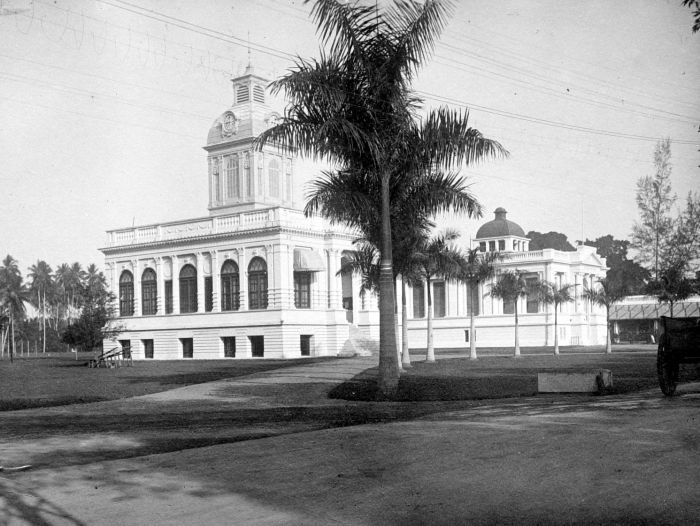
Branch office in Medan

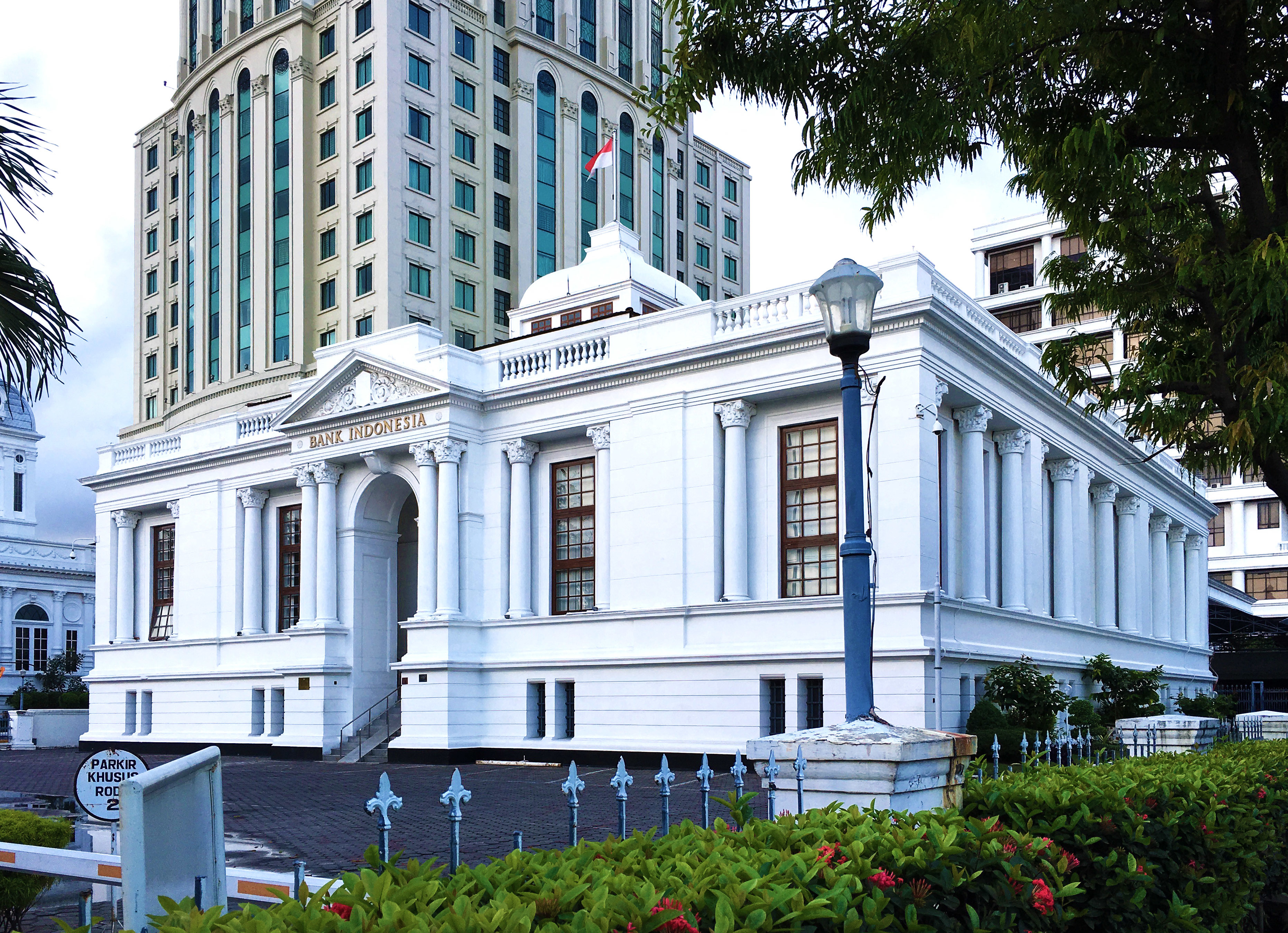
The same building, now Town Hall and Bank Indonesia branch

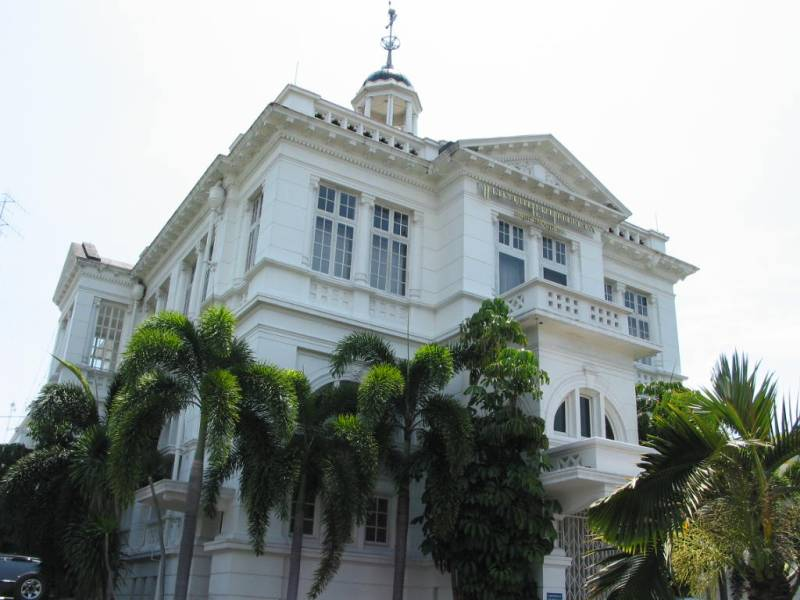
Branch office in Surakarta

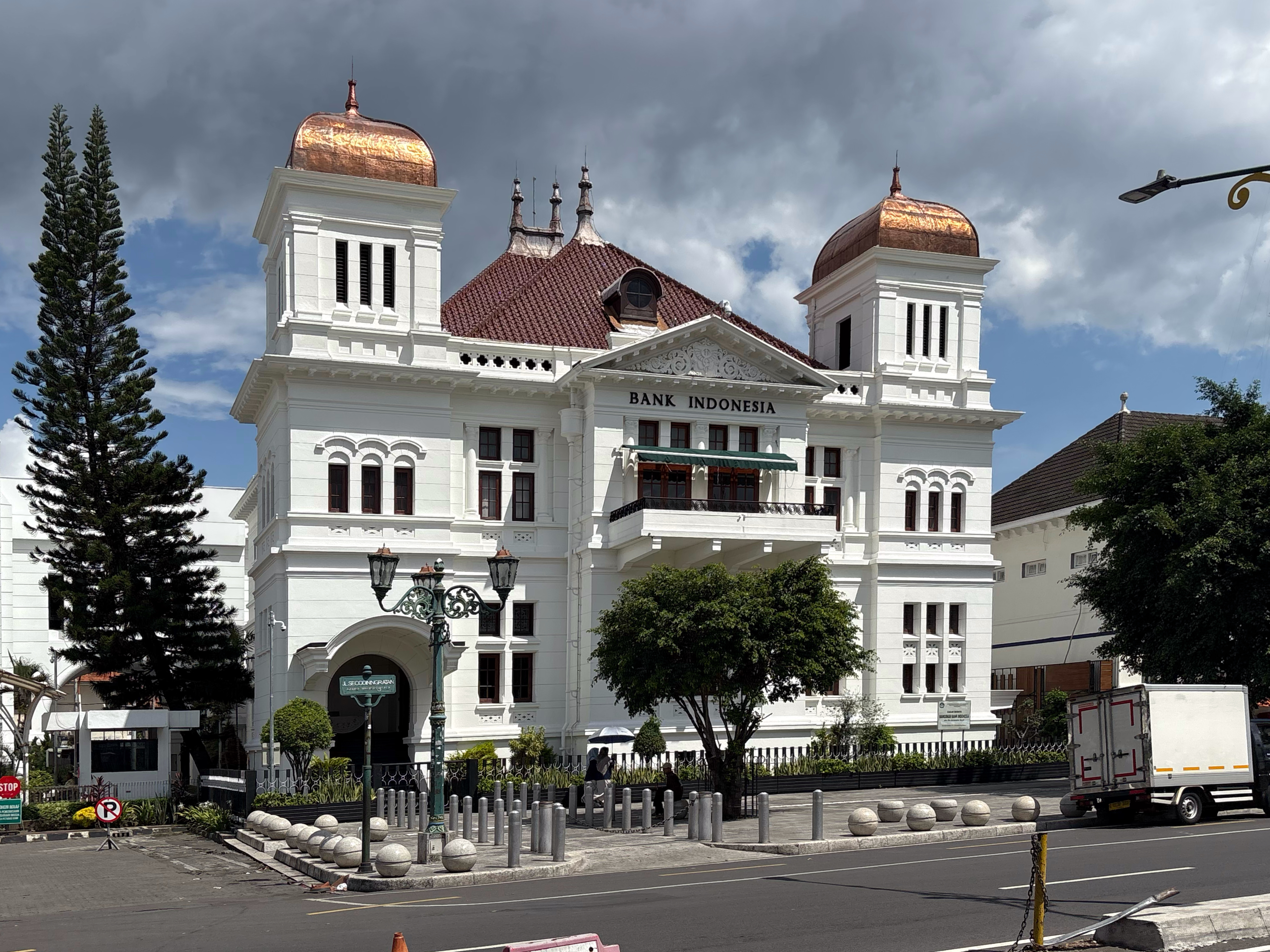
Branch office in Yogyakarta

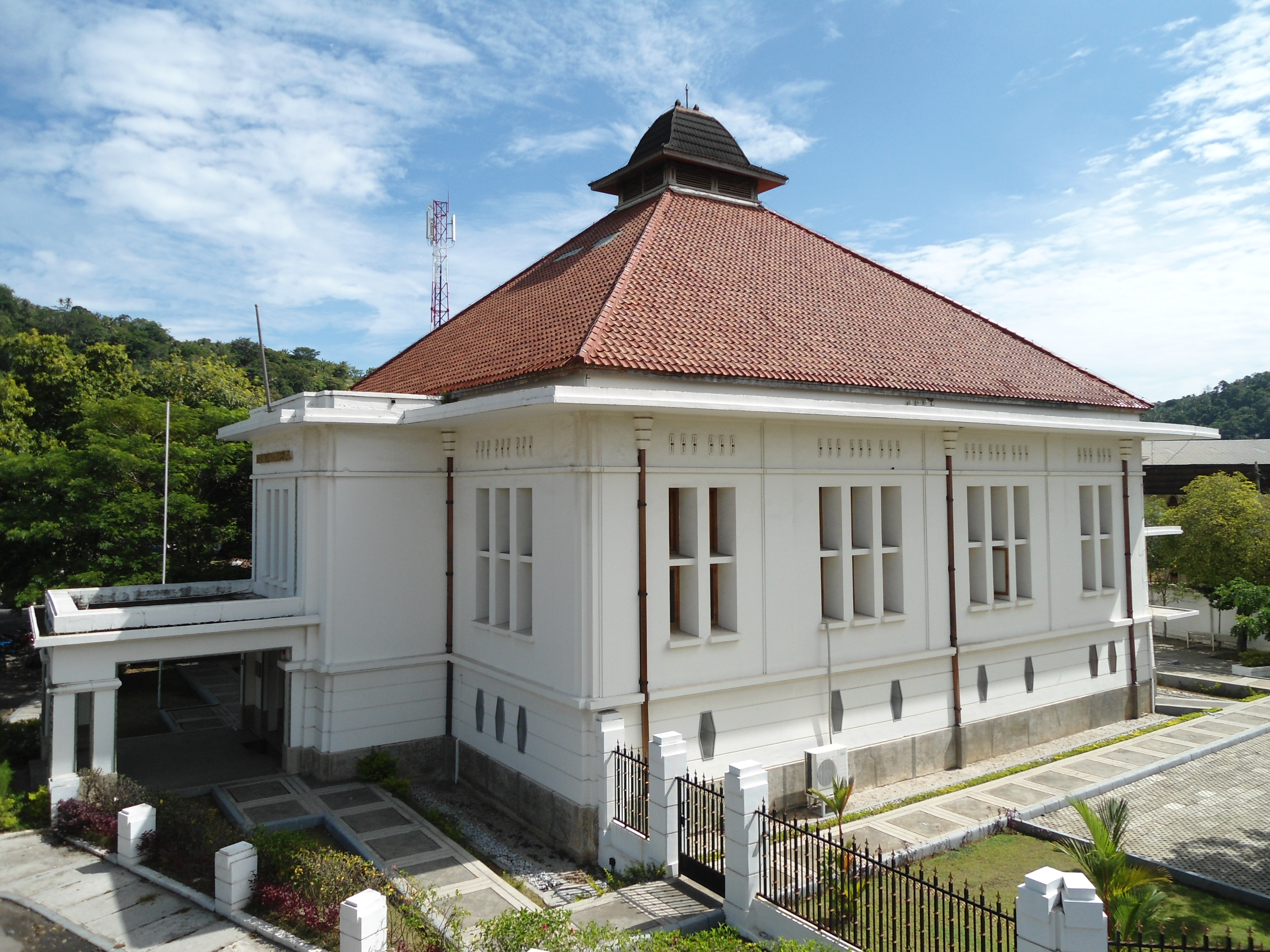
Branch office in Padang

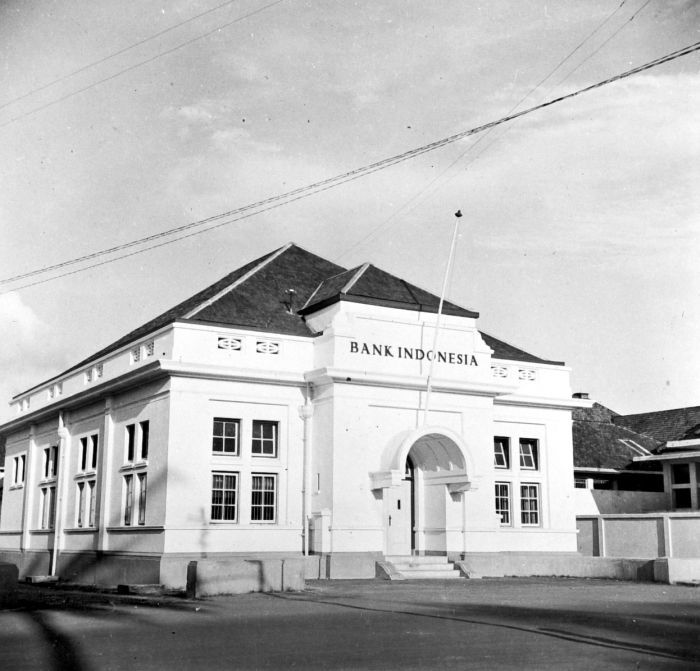
Branch office in Palembang (1950s)

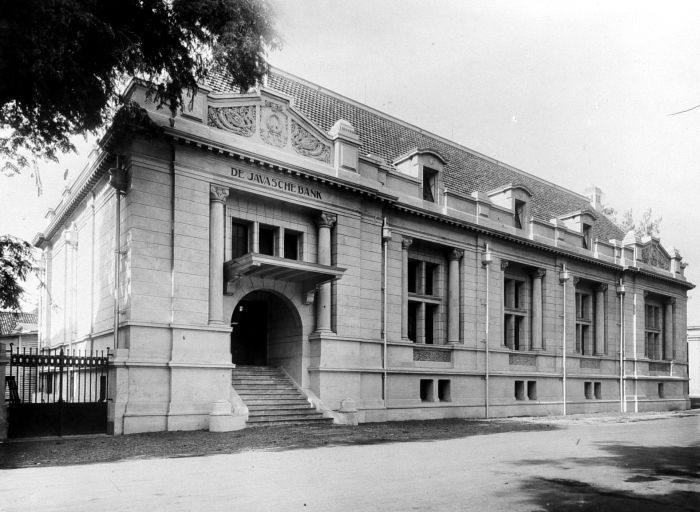
Branch office in Surabaya

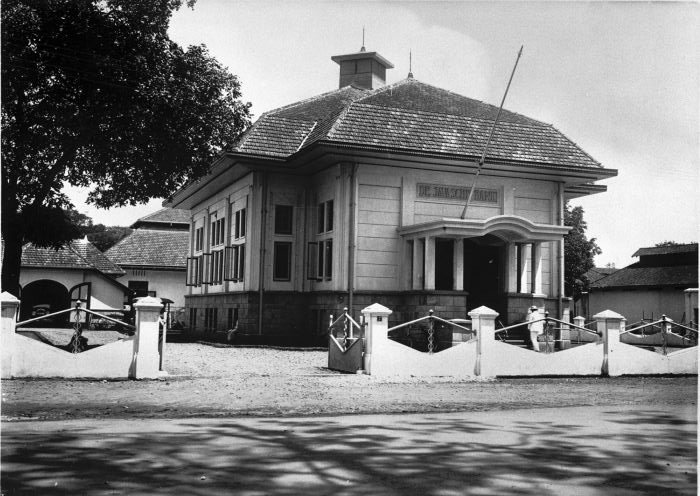
Branch office in Malang

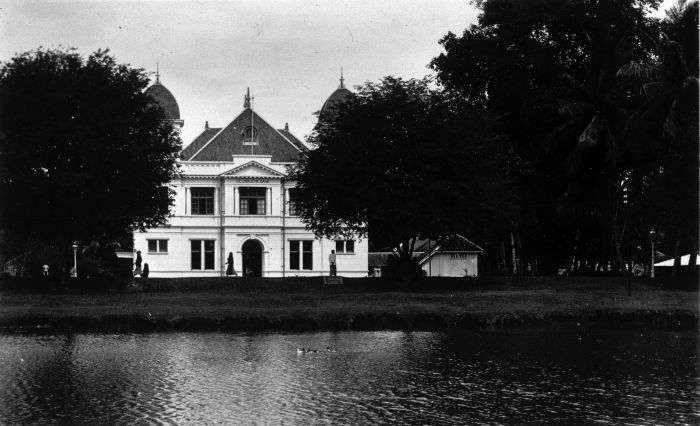
Branch office in Banda Aceh

== Banknotes ==
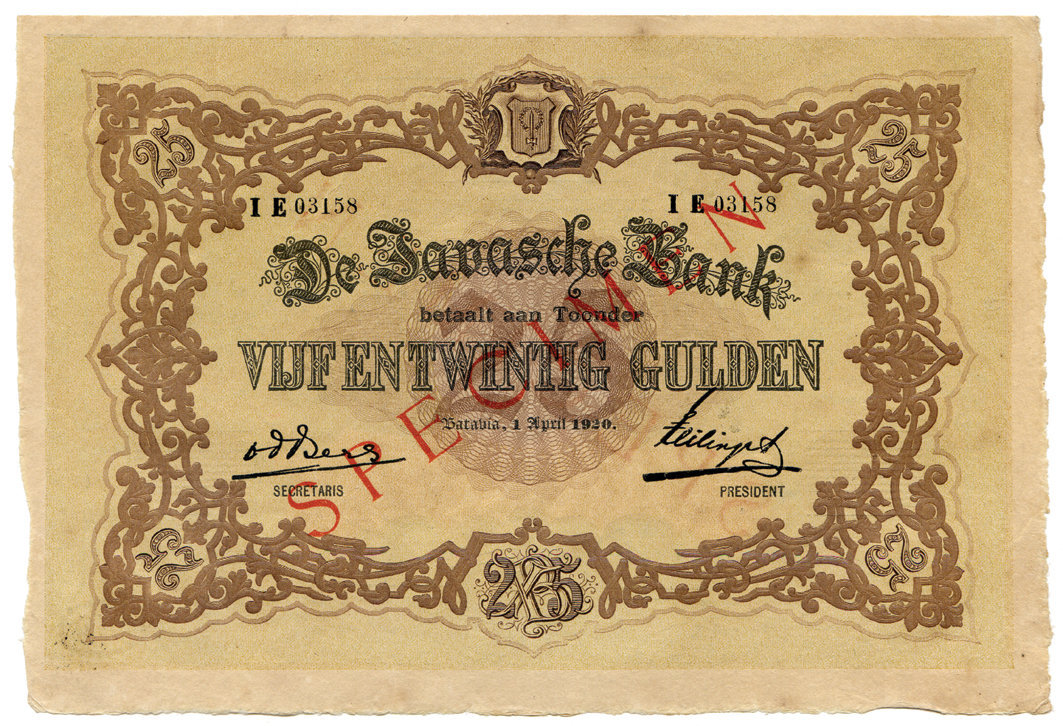
25 Guilders, 1920

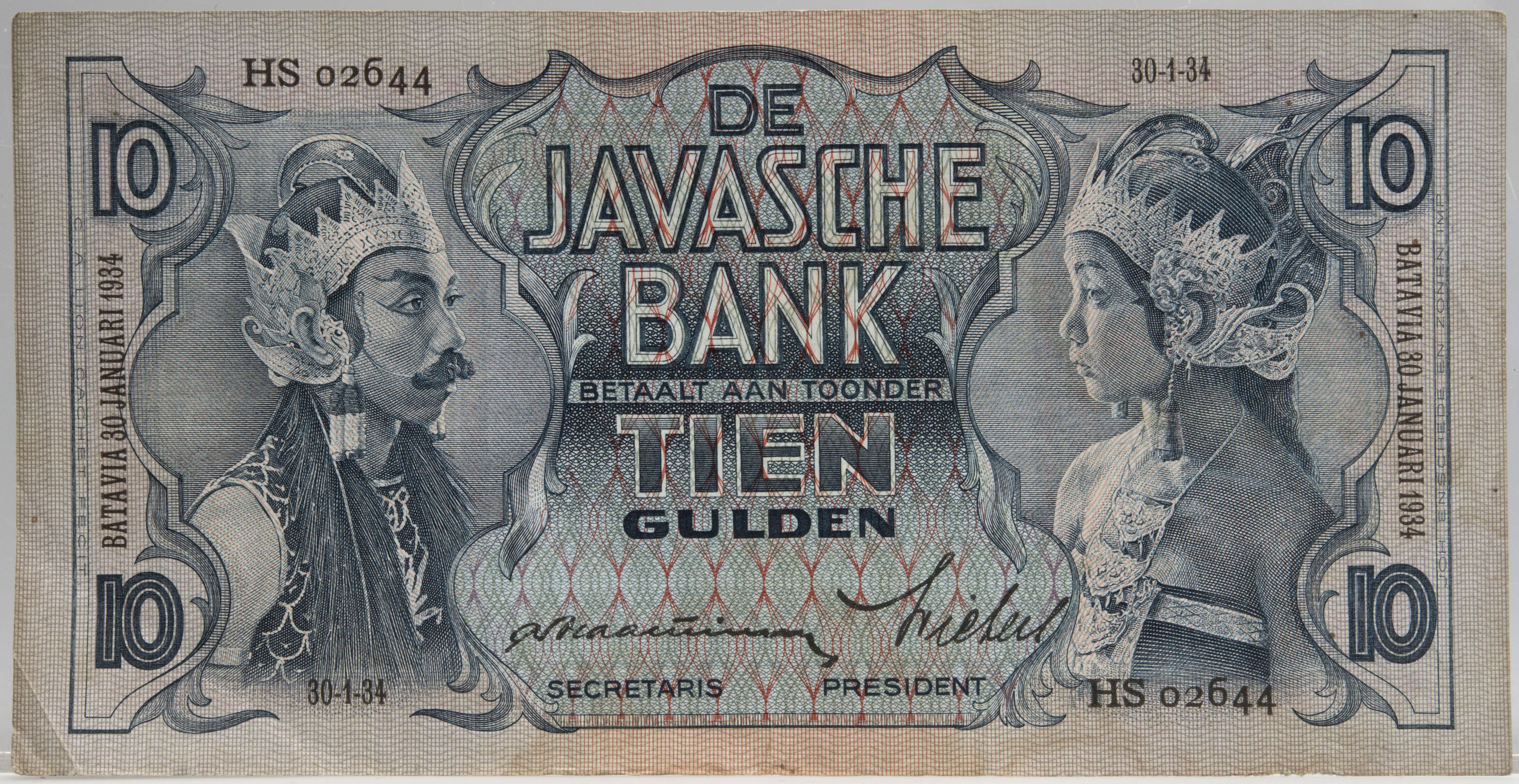
10 Guilders, 1934

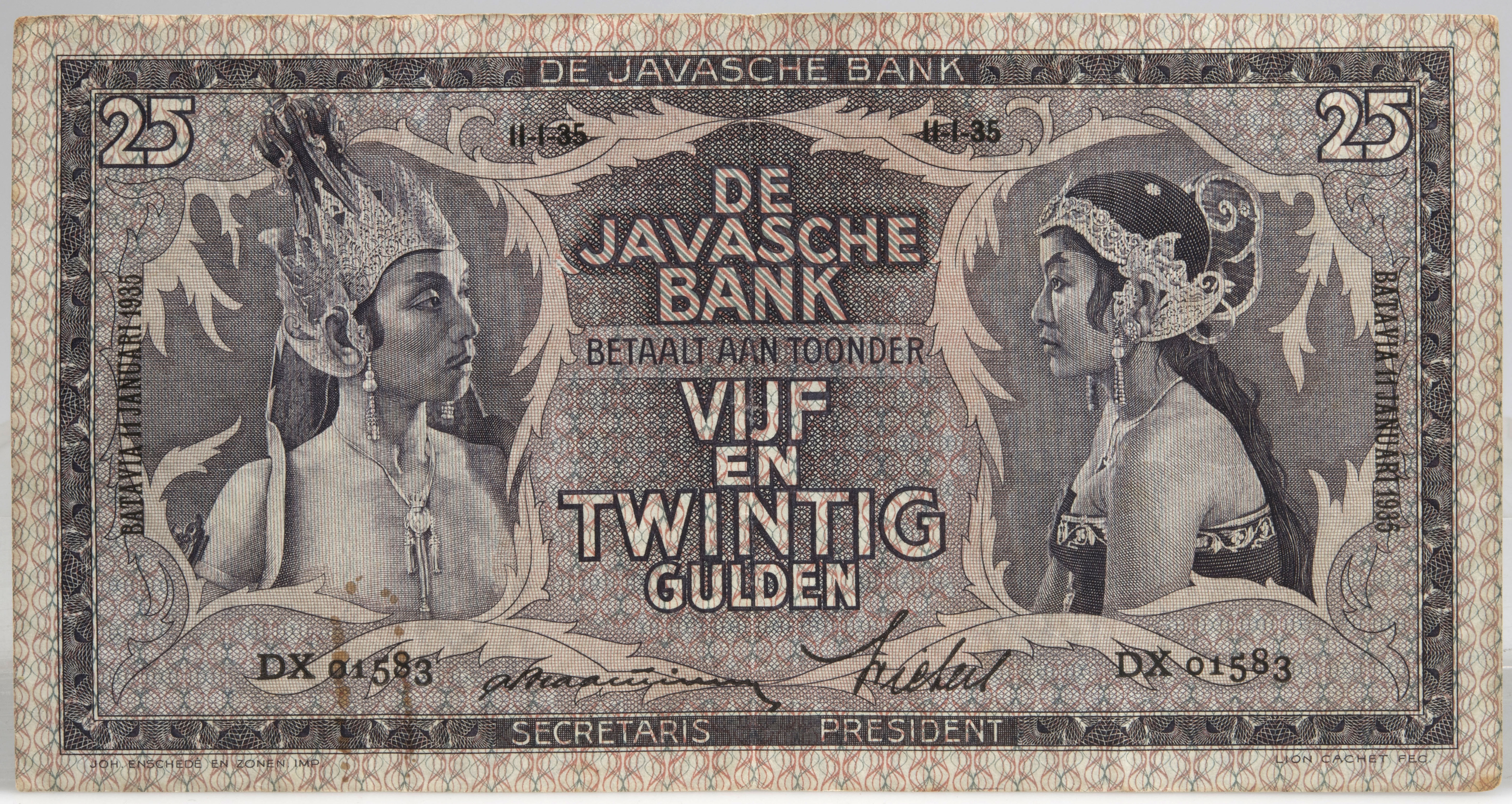
25 Guilders, 1935

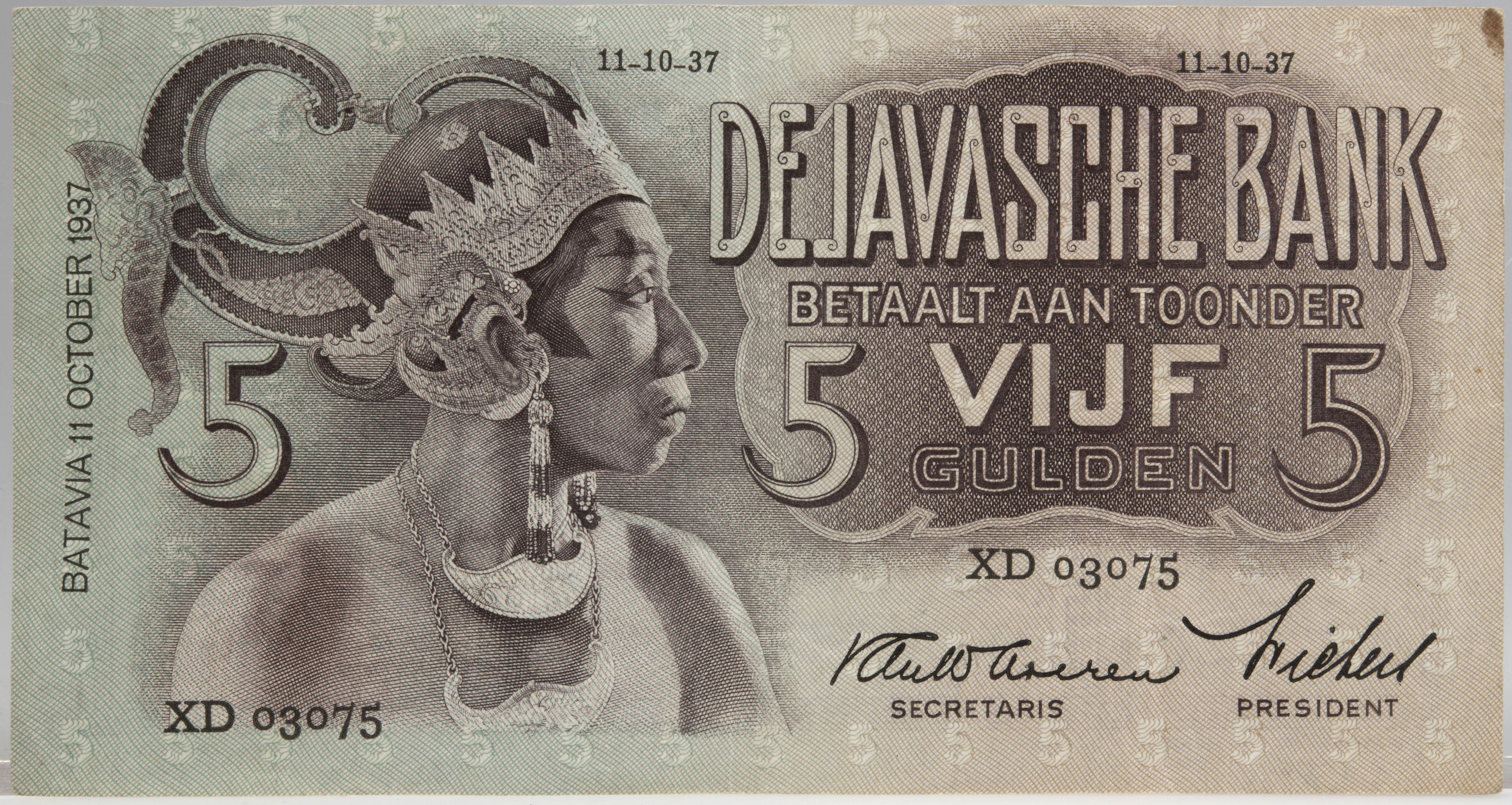
5 Guilders, 1937

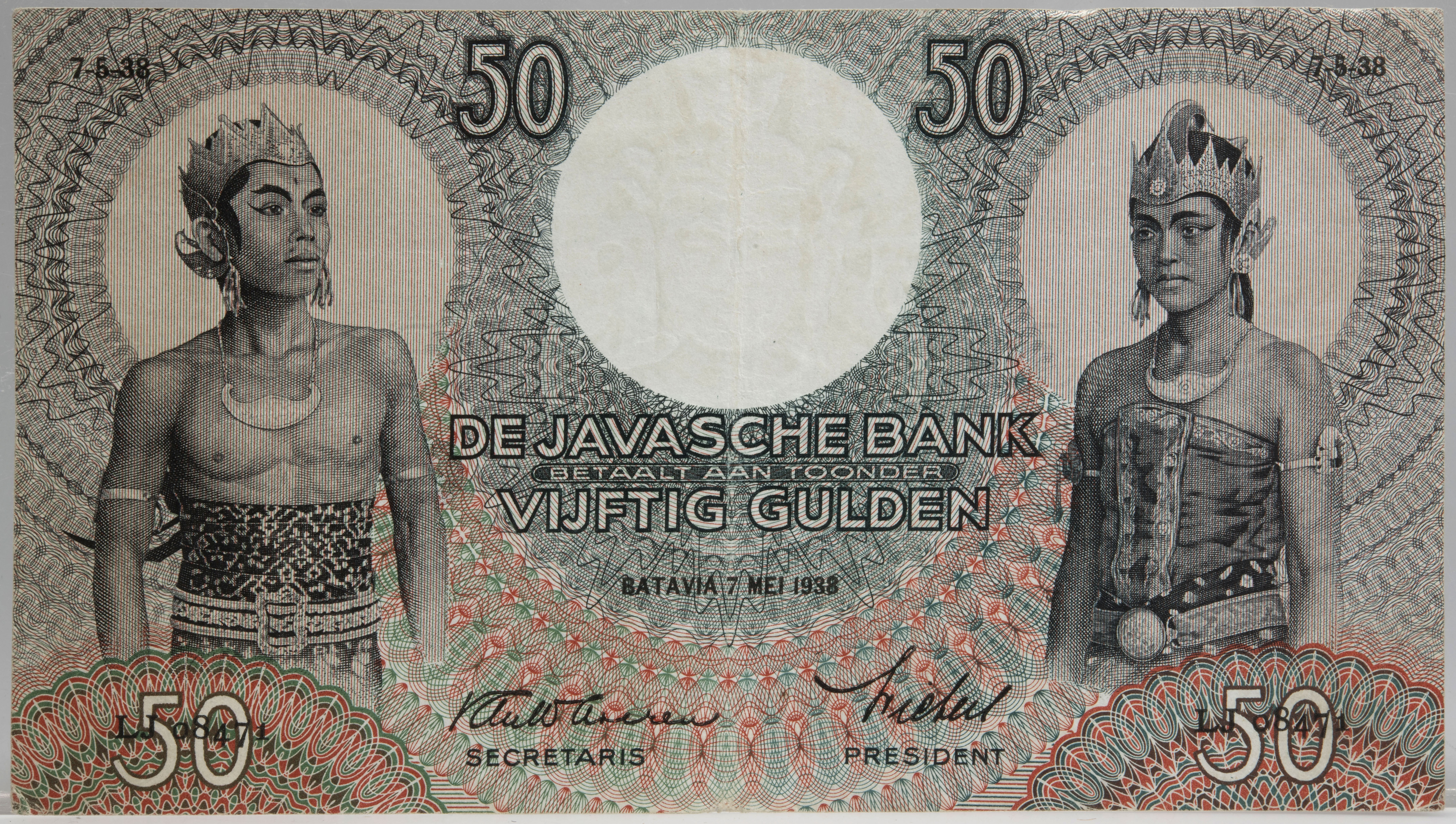
50 Guilders, 1938

== See also ==
- Banque de l'Algérie
- Ottoman Bank
- Bank of Indochina
- Netherlands Indies gulden
- Japanese government-issued currency in the Dutch East Indies
- History of the Indonesian rupiah
- List of banks in the Netherlands
