= Jencks =

Jencks could refer to:

- Jencks v. United States, a U.S. Supreme Court case
  - Jencks Act, a law passed by the U.S. Congress regarding the rules of procedure in Federal courts, after the Supreme Court case had been decided

== People with the surname Jencks ==
- Bob Jencks (1941–2010), American football player
- Charles Jencks (1939–2019) American cultural theorist, landscape designer, architectural historian, cancer center founder
- Christopher Jencks (1936–2025), American social scientist
- Clinton Jencks (1918–2005), American labor and social justice activist
- Maggie Keswick Jencks (1941–1995), Scottish writer, artist and garden designer
- Penelope Jencks (born 1936), American sculptor
- Richard Jencks (1921–2014), American television executive and lawyer
- William Jencks (1927–2007), American biochemist

== See also ==
- Jenckes, a surname
- Jenks (disambiguation)
