= Edwin W. Kemmerer =

American economist (1875–1945)

Edwin Walter Kemmerer
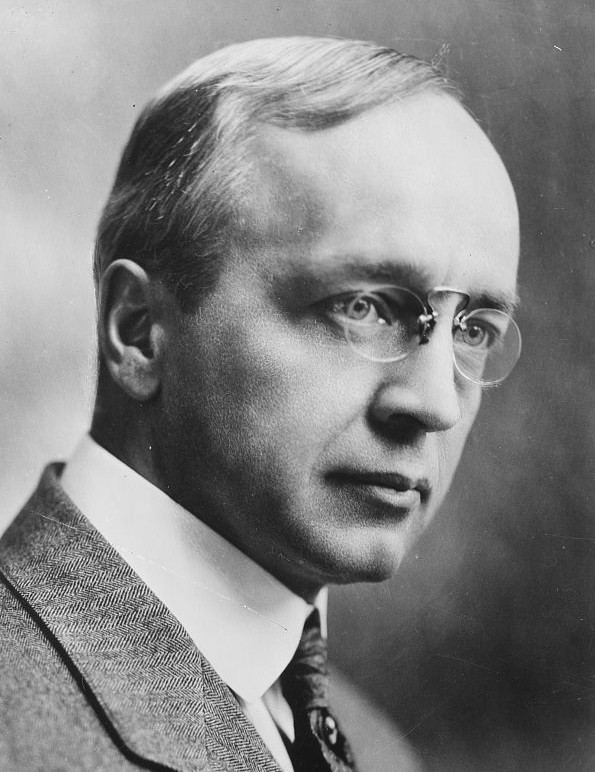
- Born: June 29, 1875; Scranton, Pennsylvania, US
- Died: December 16, 1945 (aged 70); Princeton, New Jersey, US

Academic background
- Influences: Jeremiah Jenks

Academic work
- Influenced: Frank Whitson Fetter

Edwin Walter Kemmerer (June 29, 1875 – December 16, 1945) was an American economist, who became famous as an economic adviser to foreign governments in many countries (Philippines, Mexico, Guatemala, Colombia, Germany, Chile, South Africa, Poland, Ecuador, Bolivia, China, Peru, and Turkey), promoting plans based on strong currencies, the gold standard, central banks, central bank independence, and balanced budgets. He helped design the U.S. Federal Reserve System in 1911, edited the American Economic Bulletin and the American Economic Review, and became president of the American Economic Association in 1926.

He graduated with honors and a Phi Beta Kappa key from Wesleyan University, and earned his Ph.D. from Cornell University, where he taught (1906–1912). At 28, was appointed Financial Adviser to the U.S. Philippine Commission. In 1912 he became a professor at Princeton University, where he was made the first director of its new International Finance Section; by then Kemmerer had a well established reputation as an international expert on improving a nation's financial and monetary policies, a role commonly referred to as money doctor. He was a member of both the American Philosophical Society and the American Academy of Arts and Sciences.

== "Money doctors" ==
All of the plans created by economic advisors like Kemmerer were aimed "towards the establishment of an internationally interconnected monetary and credit system based on stable national currencies in fixed value relationship with gold and other gold currencies". Consequently, the plans required among other things, central bank independence, the payment of all debts and balanced state budgets.

R. Nötel, in his essay on the International Credit and Finance of Eastern Europe, complains that the advice of these money doctors was "sometimes discordant", adding that their plans were written not only to have the debtors comply with the rules of the international financial system, but also to obtain the approval of much needed loans.

As a "money doctor" Kemmerer was not alone: in Poland he was followed by Charles Dewey; Romania had the Frenchmen Charles Rist and Roger Auboin; and for Hungary and Germany, the Americans Jeremiah Smith Jr and S. Parker Gilbert, respectively.

== The Polish Stabilization – Context ==
After two failed attempts at bringing "galloping" inflation under control, in April 1924 a somewhat satisfactory stabilization scheme was established that reigned in inflation and laid the foundations for a modern financial system. This came at the cost of deflation and increasing political instability, exacerbated by the expiry in 1925 of the Upper Silesia convention obliging Germans to buy 6 million tons of Polish coal, which made for a quarter of Polish exports.

The political and increasingly economic instability came to an end with the coup d'état that brought general Józef Piłsudski in May 1926, a popular military hero, to power. His increasingly right wing politics appealed to American diplomats and bankers, and the US at the time was attempting to "rebuild Europe's war-torn economy and thereby protect crucial agricultural and industrial markets, block the spread of Bolshevism, and ease the danger of renewed war and revolution."

At the same time that Poland was seeking help with financial stabilization and new loans, the unresolved issue of the Polish corridor, which Versailles had given it to the chagrin of Germany, added some complexity to the issue of the nationality of any future economic advisors, for the British supported the Germans and wanted Poland brought under the control of their unpopular League of Nations Financial Committee. So the Poles, after consulting with Benjamin Strong, President of the Federal Reserve Bank of New York, invited Kemmerer "to draw up a comprehensive plan for economic reform and stabilization".

== Kemmerer's role in the Second Polish Stabilization ==
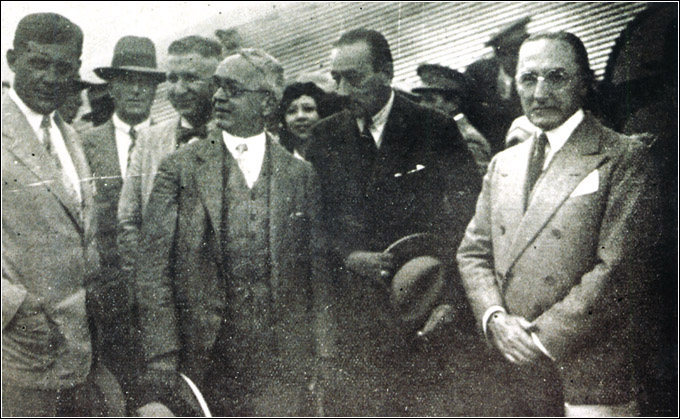
Kemmerer (4th from left) in a mission to Peru (1931)

Unlike Charles Dewey, who would succeed him as economic advisor to the Polish government, Kemmerer only stayed in Poland a few months to write up his report, while Dewey stayed for more than two years. The New York Times describes Kemmerer's role as that of a doctor who visits the patient "only to diagnose and prescribe, and then come briskly away, leaving the patient to take his own doses or to depend on a foreign nurse".

Kemmerer completed an extremely detailed report on the condition of the Polish economy, taking account of its agriculture, industry and communications infrastructure; his report included detailed maps of the Polish Central Bank's offices around the country, together with a complex diagram of its organizational structure. He even went so far as to hold forth on Poland's security: "As long as Poland's international problems remain as they are ... a strong army must, of course, be maintained."

But his recommendations apparently did not consider the particular circumstances of the Polish socioeconomic environment, which his report would have helped show. A mechanism for "automatic budgeting stability, restraint, and control", previously implanted in Colombia, Chile and Ecuador, was the same as the one that was to be implemented in Poland, a country that even with Pilsudski at the helm, was famous for its political instability.

In the end it all came down to the prestige brought by the advisor and the ceremony of the apparent implementation of his plan by the country that invited him, as Kemmerer himself admitted: "A country that appoints American financial advisers and follows their advice in reorganizing its finances, along what American investors consider to be the most successful modern lines, increases its chances of appealing to the American investor and of obtaining from him capital on favorable terms."

Though Kemmerer suggested that the Poles take out only a $15 million loan for stabilization of the national currency, they negotiated a private one with the American banks B.A. Tompkins and Bankers Trust for $61 million, of which $15 million were for development – leaving 45 million dollars for the stabilization of the zloty, or nearly four times what Kemmerer had recommended.

Though the loan was meant to lead to further ones that would strengthen Poland's financial system and promote its economic development, in mid-1928 foreign lending from Wall Street dried up as the Fed raised interest rates and a domestic speculative boom got underway. Kemmerer, and the US's attempts to stabilize the Polish economy failed as the country sank further into political instability.

== Publications ==
- Edwin Walter Kemmerer. 1907. Money and Credit Instruments in their Relation to General Prices. Henry Holt.
- Edwin Walter Kemmerer. 1916. Modern Currency Reforms. Macmillan.
- Edwin Walter Kemmerer (1920). High Prices and Deflation. Princeton University Press.
- "Economic Advisory Work for Governments," in American Economic Review 17, no. 1 (March 1927), 1–12. JSTOR 1813680
- Edwin Walter Kemmerer (2017) [1934]. Kemmerer on Money. Taylor & Francis. ISBN 9781138634534.
- Gold and The Gold Standard: The Story of Gold Money Past, Present, and Future, published in 1944.
