= Money doctor =

Category of international economic and financial experts

In 20th-century history, a money doctor refers to economic and financial experts that helped countries improve their financial and monetary policies, often through the creation or reform of the national central bank. Both the expression and practice of money doctors were most common in the first half of the century, after which their individual contributions were increasingly replaced by the more institutionalized role of the International Monetary Fund. Most money doctors were themselves working on behalf of a government or central bank, or of the Economic and Financial Organization of the League of Nations during the interwar period; some influential private bankers advising governments were also viewed as money doctors. Prominent money doctors included Americans Charles Arthur Conant and Edwin W. Kemmerer, Argentine Raúl Prebisch, Belgian Robert Triffin, Britons Otto Niemeyer and Walter J. F. Williamson, Frenchman Jean Monnet and Charles Rist, and Japanese Megata Tanetarō.

== Early examples ==
An early example had been Jean Gustave Courcelle-Seneuil, a French economist in the employment of the Government of Chile in the late 1850s and early 1860s. The advice provided by early money doctors to governments was often linked with strategies of foreign influence or even domination, as in the case of Megata Tanetarō who in the early 1900s advised the Korean Empire on improving the country's chaotic monetary system but simultaneously advanced Japanese interests that would soon result in Korea's colonization. In China, two successive money-doctoring initiatives were led before World War I, respectively by American Jeremiah Jenks in 1903 and Dutchman Gerard Vissering in 1912.

== Interwar period ==
International economic advice, referred to as money doctoring, became a fully recognized professional activity by the mid-1920s, building on longstanding earlier practice and reinforced by international consensus-building at the Brussels International Financial Conference (1920) and the Genoa Economic and Financial Conference (1922). In the aftermath of these gatherings, money doctors were employed by the League of Nations to help stabilize national economies and establish independent central banks, particularly in countries of Central and Eastern Europe.

They included Dutchman Alfred Rudolph Zimmerman, Swiss Charles Schnyder von Wartensee, Dutchman Anton van Gijn, and American Robert Kay in Austria; American Jeremiah Smith Jr. and Briton Harry Arthur Siepmann in Hungary; Frenchmen René Charron, Jean Watteau, Pierre Cheysson, and Estonian Nikolai Köstner in Bulgaria; Briton William Horace Finlayson in Greece; and Briton Walter James Franklin Williamson in Estonia. Meanwhile, several Latin American governments hired Kemmerer to advise them on monetary reforms, such as Mexico in 1917, Guatemala in 1919, Colombia in 1923, Chile in 1925, Ecuador in 1927, Bolivia in 1928, and Peru in 1931.

According to historian Stefano Ugolini, British money doctors were specifically motivated to promote a sterling-based gold-exchange standard, which motivated them to define an "ideal type" of central bank that could be replicated in multiple country contexts. In total, 99 central banks were established in the half-century following the Brussels Conference, namely between 1921 and 1971.

== Recent usage ==
The reference to money doctors has been made in more recent contexts, not least that of Russia in the 1990s. The expression has also been used in unrelated contexts, e.g. to refer to investment advisers.

== See also ==
- Bretton Woods Conference
