= Walter James Franklin Williamson =

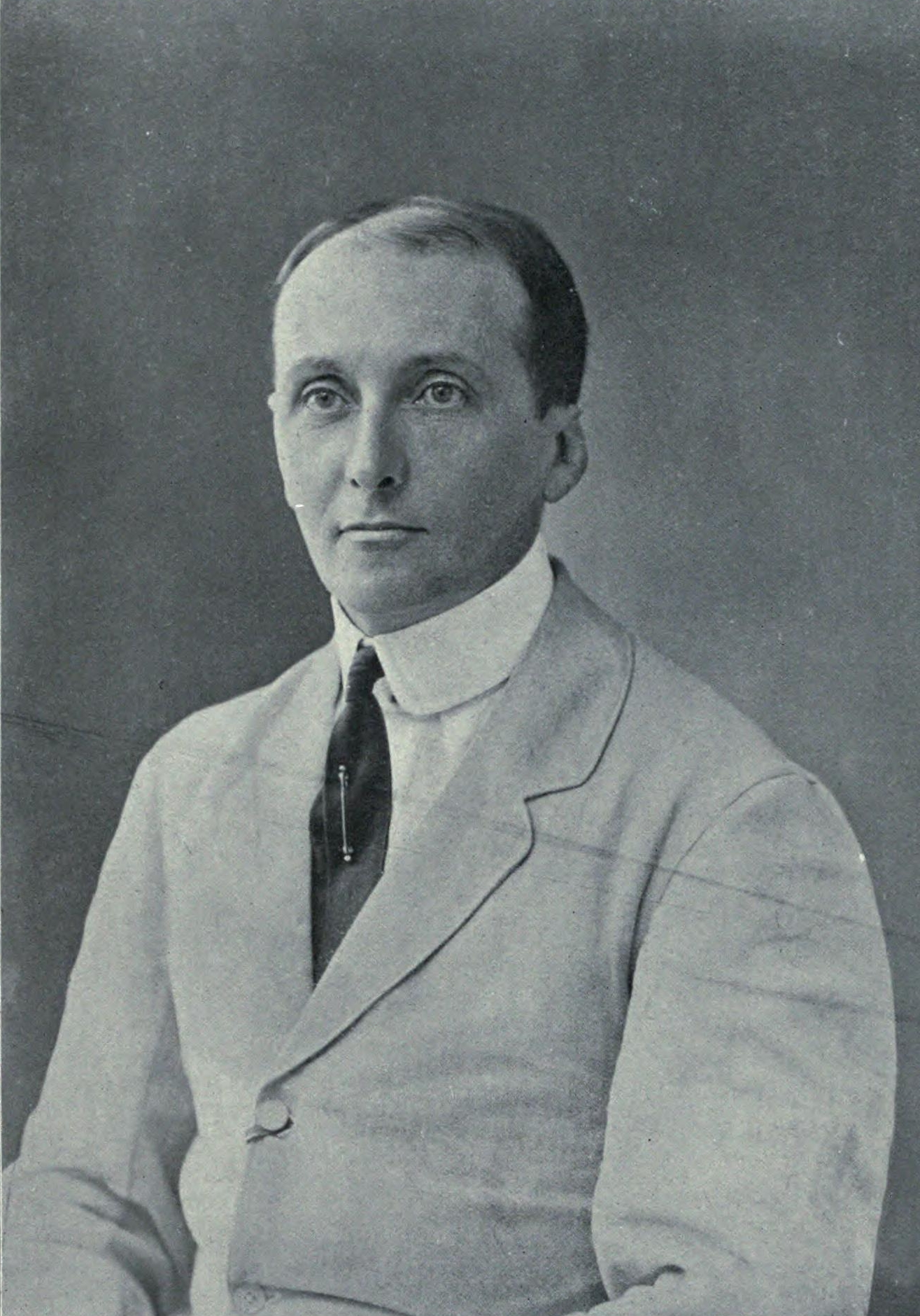
c. 1907

Sir Walter James Franklin Williamson (16 April 1867 – 19 November 1954) was a colonial British official who worked as a financial advisor to the Kingdom of Siam. He also took an interest in collecting stamps and studied the birds of the region, collecting specimens of natural history from Thailand. Several taxa have been described on the basis of his specimens and many commemorate him. He was for sometime editor of the Journal of the Natural History Society of Siam along with Malcolm Smith.

Williamson was the son of James Franklin Williamson of the Indian Public Works Department. He studied at the City of London School and Clifton House School, Eastbourne after which he joined the Indian Civil Service serving as an accountant general for India from 1890 to 1900 and then as director of paper currency in Siam from 1900 to 1904. He then served as a financial advisor to the Siam Government from 1904 to 1925 and subsequently served in Estonia and for the League of Nations. He was knighted in 1927. He married Marion Maria Winifred (21 October 1875 – 30 May 1945), daughter of Lancelot Crozier in 1894. He also wrote on the birds of the Bangkok region and published on some taxonomic nomenclature issues.

Williamson collected birds from Thailand, also sending out collectors of eggs and skins to other parts including Surat Thani, Nakhon Si Thammarat and Narathiwat provinces. His wife is commemorated in Mirafra erythrocephala marionae. He is commemorated in Mirafra javanica williamsoni E. C. S. Baker, 1915, Micropternus brachyurus williamsoni Kloss, 1918, Zosterops palpebrosus williamsoni H. C. Robinson & Kloss, 1919, Malacocincla abbotti williamsoni Deignan, 1948, Ploceus manyar williamsoni B. P. Hall, 1957, Muscicapa williamsoni Deignan, 1957 and Tragulus williamsoni Kloss, 1916. His entire collection was bequeathed to the Natural History Museum, London.

Williamson died in Kensington and is buried in Golders Green.

== Publications ==
Williamson's publications on birds include:

- Williamson, W.J.F. (1916). "A list of birds not previously recorded from Siam with notes". Journal of the Natural History of Siam. 2: 59–65.
- Williamson, W. J. F. (1914). "A preliminary list of the birds of Bangkok". Journal of the Natural History of Siam. 1: 41–48.
- Williamson, W. J. F. (1918). "New or noteworthy bird-records from Siam". Journal of the Natural History of Siam. 3: 15–42.
- Williamson, W. J. F. (1915). "Corrections and additions to preliminary list of Bangkok birds". Journal of the Natural History of Siam. 1: 196–199.
- Williamson, W.J.F. (1914). "The Birds of Bangkok. Part 1". Journal of the Natural History of Siam. 1: 71–92.
- Williamson, W.J.F. (1915). "The Birds of Bangkok. Part 2". Journal of the Natural History of Siam. 1: 200–210.
- Williamson, W.J.F. (1916). "The Birds of Bangkok. Part 3". Journal of the Natural History of Siam. 2: 185–214.
- Williamson, W.J.F. (1917). "The Birds of Bangkok. Part 4". Journal of the Natural History of Siam. 2: 319–339.
- Williamson, W.J.F. (1916). "The Giant Ibis". Journal of the Natural History Society of Siam. 2: 71–72.
- Williamson, W.J.F. (1916). "Occurrence of the Barred Ground-dove (Geopelia striata) in Siam". Journal of the Natural History Society of Siam. 2: 72–73.
- Williamson, Sir Walter (1947). "On some Birds from Thailand, etc". Ibis. 89 (1): 98–104. doi:10.1111/j.1474-919X.1947.tb04919.x.
- Williamson, W. J. F. (1921). "The Giant Ibis (Thaumatibis gigantea) in Cambodia". Journal of the Natural History of Siam. 4: 196.

He also wrote a catalogue of postal stamps with a note on the Thai currency.

== See also ==
- Money doctor
