= Jean Gustave Courcelle-Seneuil =

French economist

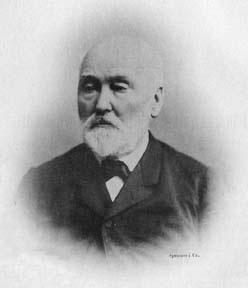
- Born: 22 December 1813; Senouillac, France
- Died: 29 June 1892 (aged 78); Paris, France
- Occupation: Economist
- Known for: Classical economics, Economic liberalism

Jean Gustave Courcelle-Seneuil /ʒɑ̃ɡysˈtav kuʁˈsɛl səˈnœj/ (22 December 1813 – 29 June 1892) was a French economist. He is considered to be the founder of classical economics and economic liberalism in Chile.

== Early life and education ==
Courcelle-Seneuil was born at Senouillac (Dordogne, France) on 22 December 1813. He attended Royal College of Poitiers at University of Poitiers and later University of Paris, where he received a law degree in 1835.

== Career ==
After Louis-Napoléon Bonaparte's coup d'état of 1851, Courcelle-Seneuil went to Chile on the invitation of the Chilean government. He was appointed as a professor of political economy and as a consultant to the Ministry of Finance. In June 1855, he began his academic work at the Instituto Nacional, and within a year, by July 1856 he joined as a faculty of philosophy and humanities at the University of Chile. Being a strong supporter of laissez-faire, his economic ideas influenced the new breed of economists and the economic policies of Chile at the time. He influenced prominent members of the Chilean elite, particularly those who had attended his courses at the University of Chile.

In 1858, the Chilean government sent Courcelle-Seneuil back to Europe as secretary and advisor to a delegation that sought a loan for the construction of Chile's national railway, the Empresa de los Ferrocarriles del Estado. During that period, he wrote Traité théorique et pratique d'économie politique.

In 1863, he returned to France. In 1879 he was selected to become Councillor of State and in 1882 was elected as a member of the Académie des Sciences Morales et Politiques.

Courcelle-Seneuil died on 29 June 1892 in Paris.

== Bibliography ==
- Traité théorique et pratique des opérations de banque (1853)
- Traité théorique et pratique d'économie politique (2 vols., 1858)
- Études sur la science sociale (1862)
- La Banque libre (1867)
- Liberté et socialisme (1868)
- Protection et libre échange (1879)

Courcelle-Seneuil also translated John Stuart Mill's Principles of Political Economy, Henry Maine's Ancient Law and Adam Smith's Wealth of Nations into French language.

== See also ==
- Money doctor
