= Patrick C. Kennell =

American academic

Patrick C. Kennell (born February 18, 1960) is Director of the Center for Intensive English Studies (CIES) at Florida State University in Tallahassee, Florida. CIES was founded by his predecessor, Frederick L. Jenks, in 1979.

In 1982, Dr. Kennell earned his Bachelor of Arts degree in Economics and Management at Albion College in Albion, Michigan. Prior to graduation, he was named tri-captain and MVP of Albion's 1982 track and field team. In addition to holding the school's record for the 400 meter dash, he played football at Albion and was inducted into the Albion Hall of Fame in 2002. In 2005, he won a gold medal for his participation in the 4x800 relay at the USA Masters Track and Field Championships.

From 1986 to 1987, Dr. Kennell worked as an instructor at Kent English in Ankara, Turkey. Upon completion of his master's degree in TESOL from the Multilingual/Multicultural Education (MMED) program at Florida State University in 1989, Dr. Kennell taught English in Ta'if, Saudi Arabia and later relocated to Denmark, where he taught at the Cambridge English School in Copenhagen from 1990 to 1996. He returned to CIES at FSU, where he was named Assistant Director in 1999.

In 2002, Dr. Kennell was awarded the degree of Doctor of Philosophy by the Florida State University College of Education. His dissertation is titled The Effect of Simultaneously Reading and Listening to Audiotapes of Expanded and Compressed Spoken Text on the Reading Rate of English as a Second Language Students. His research in the development of reading fluency is the foundation for the reading curriculum at CIES. The same year, he was named Director of CIES.

In 2006, Dr. Kennell served as President of University and College Intensive English Programs (UCIEP).

Dr. Kennell and his wife, Kirsten Ebbesen, were married on September 21, 1990 in Copenhagen, Denmark. They reside in Tallahassee, Florida with their three children.
