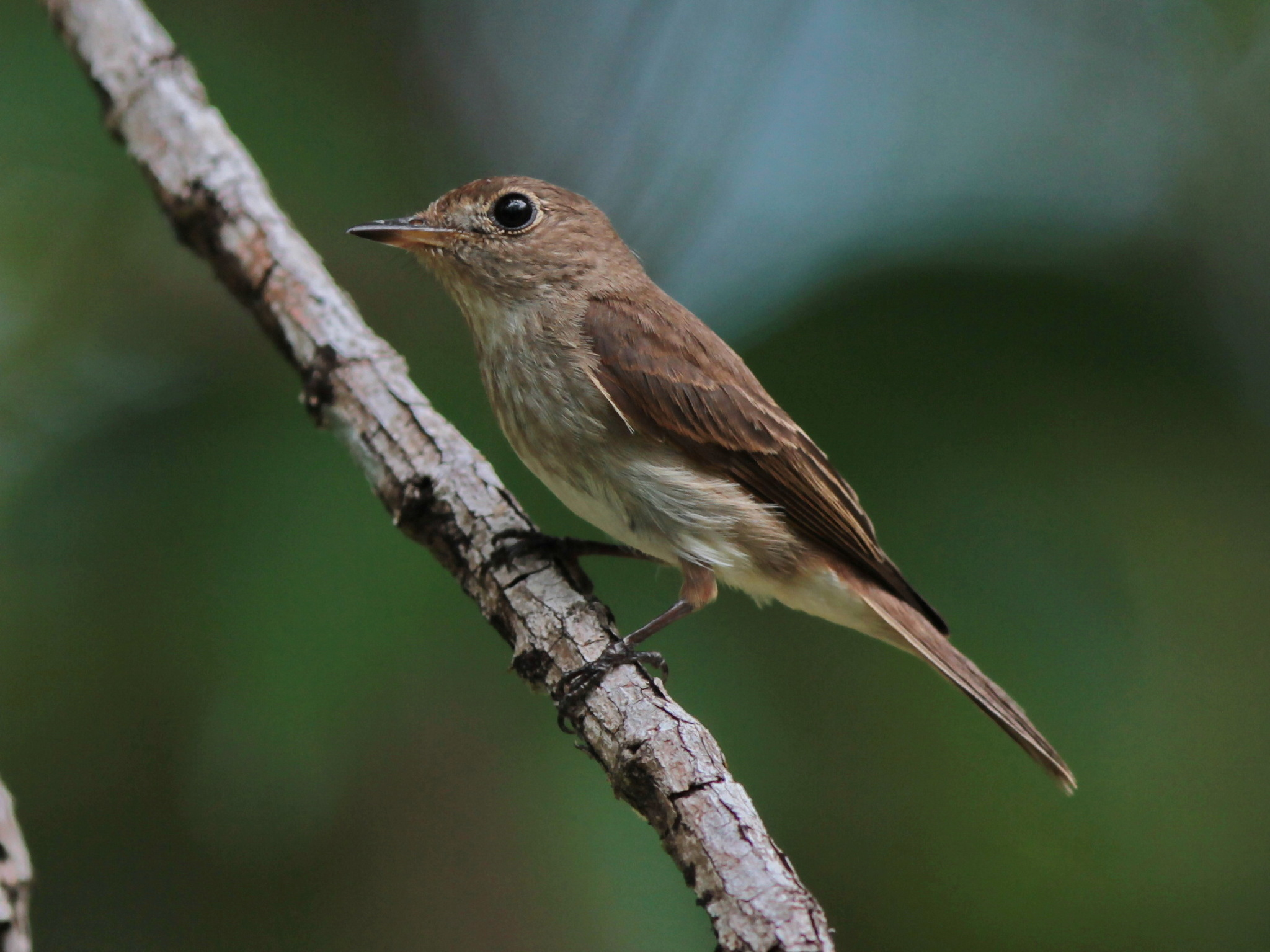

Scientific classification
- Kingdom: Animalia
- Phylum: Chordata
- Class: Aves
- Order: Passeriformes
- Family: Muscicapidae
- Genus: Muscicapa
- Species: M. williamsoni

Binomial name
- Muscicapa williamsoni Deignan, 1957

= Brown-streaked flycatcher =

Species of bird

The brown-streaked flycatcher (Muscicapa williamsoni) is a species of bird in the family Muscicapidae. It is found in southern Myanmar, southern Thailand, northern peninsular Malaysia, and northeast Borneo. Some authorities consider it to be a subspecies of the Asian brown flycatcher. In 2020, a vagrant was sighted 300 km (190 mi) south of the Australian town of Broome and its identity was confirmed from DNA analysis of the droppings of the bird. The species has a rufescent plumage in the breeding season and then becomes drab. The species name is after the collector Sir Walter James Franklin Williamson.
