= E. N. Jenckes Store =

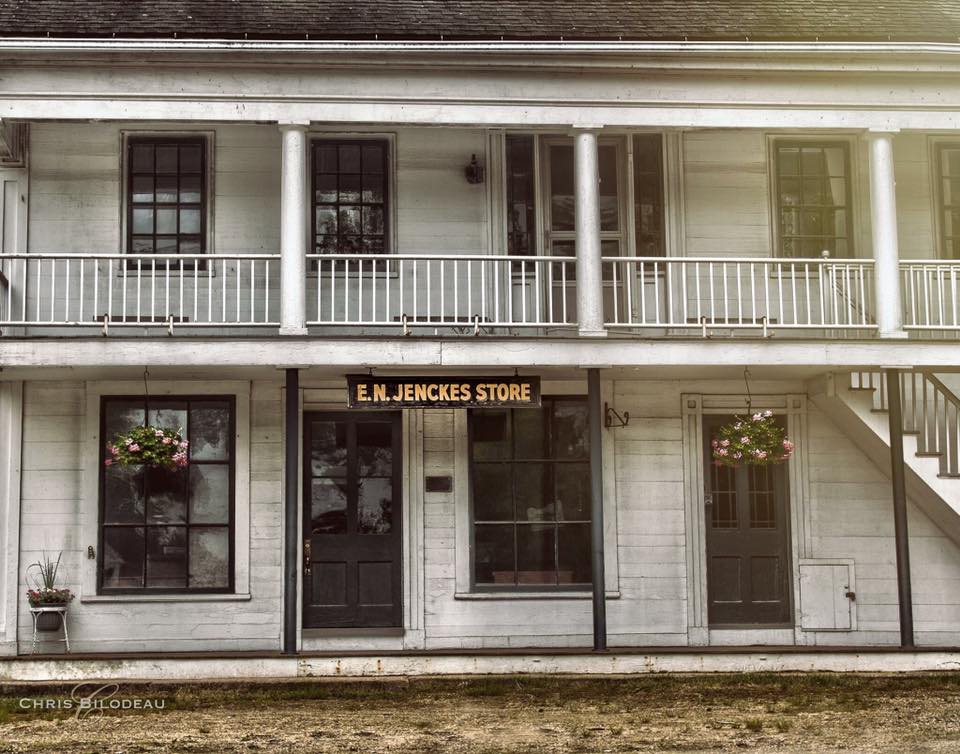

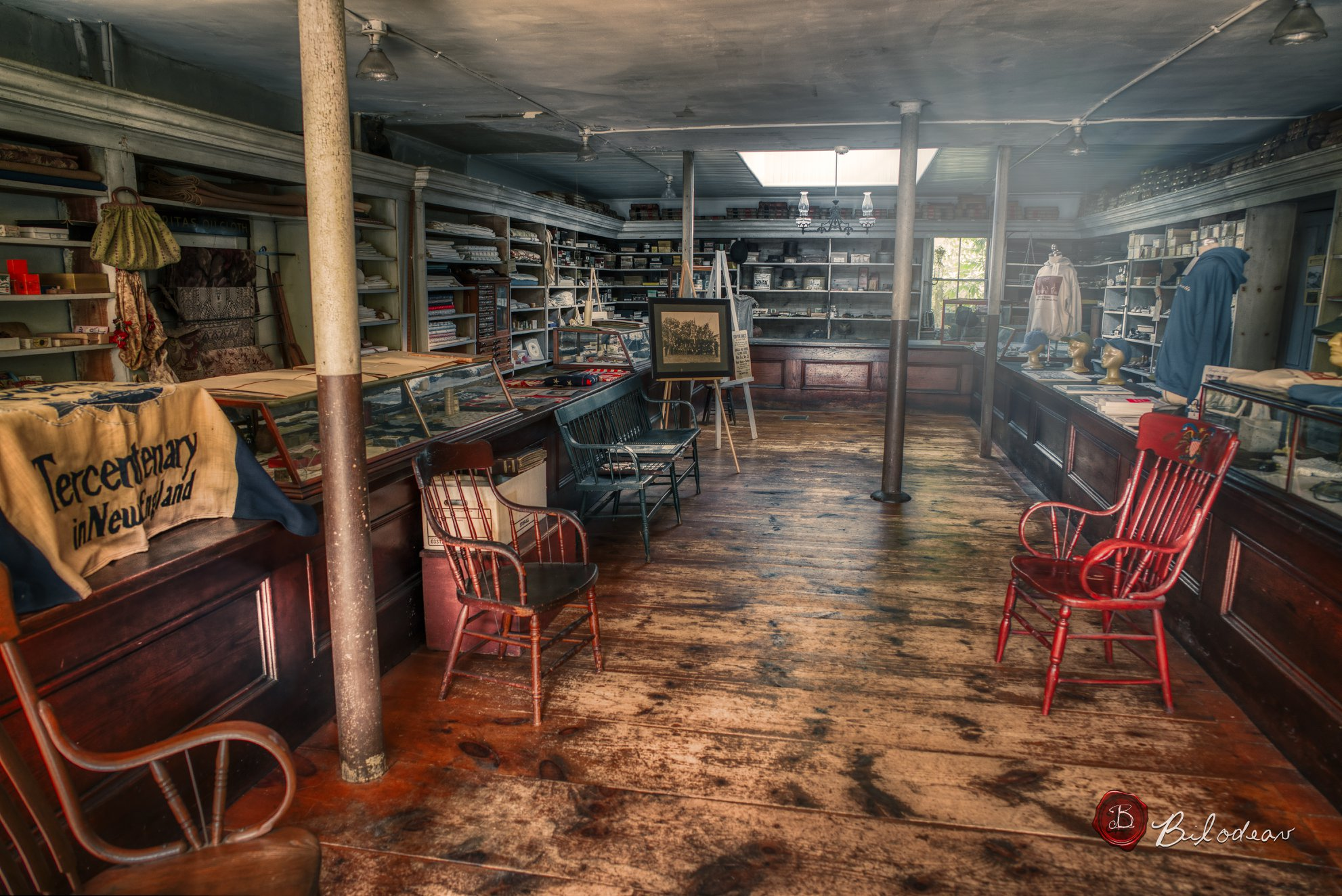
Interior view of main store

The E. N. Jenckes Store is a historic store on Main Street in Douglas, Massachusetts. The Greek Revival two-story wood-frame structure was built in 1833; it features a side-gable configuration in which the roof overhangs a two-story porch. The store was built by Elias Balcome, but was operated by members of the Jenckes family for most of the 20th century. The building is now a museum operated by the Douglas Historical Society.

The building was listed on the National Register of Historic Places in 1988.

== See also ==
- National Register of Historic Places listings in Worcester County, Massachusetts
