= Joseph Jenckes =

Joseph Jenckes may refer to:

- Joseph Jenckes Sr. (1599–1683), recipient of first machine patent in America at Lynn, Massachusetts
- Joseph Jenckes Jr. (1628–1717), founder of Pawtucket, Rhode Island
- Joseph Jenckes (governor) (1656–1740), governor of the Colony of Rhode Island and Providence Plantations
