= Kennell Jackson Jr. =

Kennell Jackson (March 19, 1941 in Farmville, Virginia – November 21, 2005) was an African American expert in East Africa and African American cultural history.

His mother, Lottie, was a school teacher and his father, Kennell, was a building contractor. He attended Robert Russa Moton High School and graduated in 1958. He later received his bachelor's degree in Biology and Chemistry in 1962 from the Hampton Institute. He graduated second in his class and was awarded a special distinction for his dissertation. He later received his Ph.D. from UCLA in 1970. After graduating, Jackson became an expert in East Africa and African American cultural history. He was a fan of collecting books, as well as modern art.

== Accomplishments ==
From 1967 to 1969 Jackson did research in Kenya for eighteen months. Later in 1969, he began teaching at Stanford University as an assistant professor. It was not until 1977 when he became an associate professor. He became active with the group African and African American Studies for several years and became director from the years 1980 until 1989. He was also a Branner Hall Resident Fellow for twenty-five years.

Jackson became known for his book, America is Me: The Most Asked and Least Understood Questions About Black American History, which was published in 1996. He also helped co-edit, Black Cultural Traffic: Crossroads in Global Performance and Popular Culture, which was published by the University of Michigan Press. In addition, he was accountable for making the Amy Biehl Foundation known in Africa.

During his teaching career, Jackson was awarded the Lloyd W. Dinkelspiel Award for Undergraduate Education and the Allan V. Cox Medal for excellence.

As the Resident Fellow of Branner Hall, the largest all-freshman dormitory on the Stanford campus, Jackson was involved in residential education and experiential education, with a focus on residences as settings for learning and discussion. He organized student museum exhibitions in the residence, including an annual T-shirt exhibition, as well as guest speakers, debates, and performances.

Before his death, Jackson was at work on a book about student life and changing university attitudes towards students, chronicling his experiences with students at Branner Hall.

== Death ==
Right before Jackson died, he was promoted to Full Professor at Stanford University. He later died on November 21 of 2005 at Stanford Hospital at the age of sixty four of pulmonary fibrosis.

== Publications ==
- America is Me: The Most Asked and Least Understood Questions About Black American History. New York: HarperCollins, 1996. ISBN 9780060170363.
- Black Cultural Traffic: Crossroads in Global Performance and Popular Culture. Ann Arbor: University of Michigan, 2005. Edited by Jackson Jr. and Harry J. Elam Jr. ISBN 9780472025459.
