= Holland Jenks House =

Historic house in Florida, United States

- U.S. National Register of Historic Places
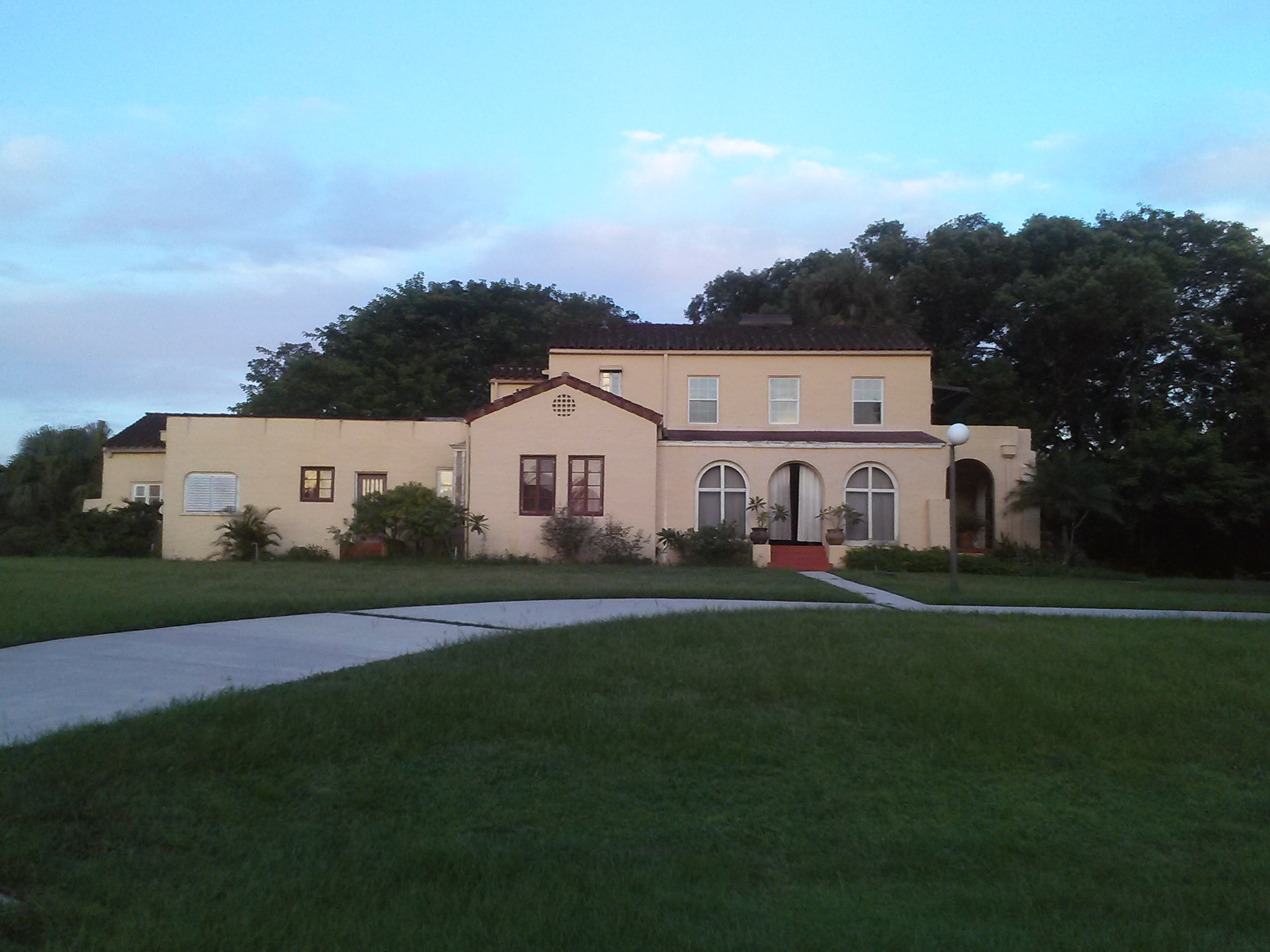

- Location within Florida
- Location: 119 Raintree Court, Auburndale, Florida
- Coordinates: 28°7′6″N 81°47′39″W
- Built: 1925
- Architectural style: Mission/Spanish Revival
- NRHP reference No.: 96000254
- Added to NRHP: March 7, 1996

The Holland Jenks House (also known as the Stuart Jenks House) is a historic home located in Auburndale, Florida, United States.

== Description and history ==
The house was completed by the fall of 1925.

On March 7, 1996, it was added to the U.S. National Register of Historic Places.
