= Jenckes House (Jenckes Hill Road, Lincoln, Rhode Island) =

Historic house in Rhode Island, United States

- U.S. National Register of Historic Places
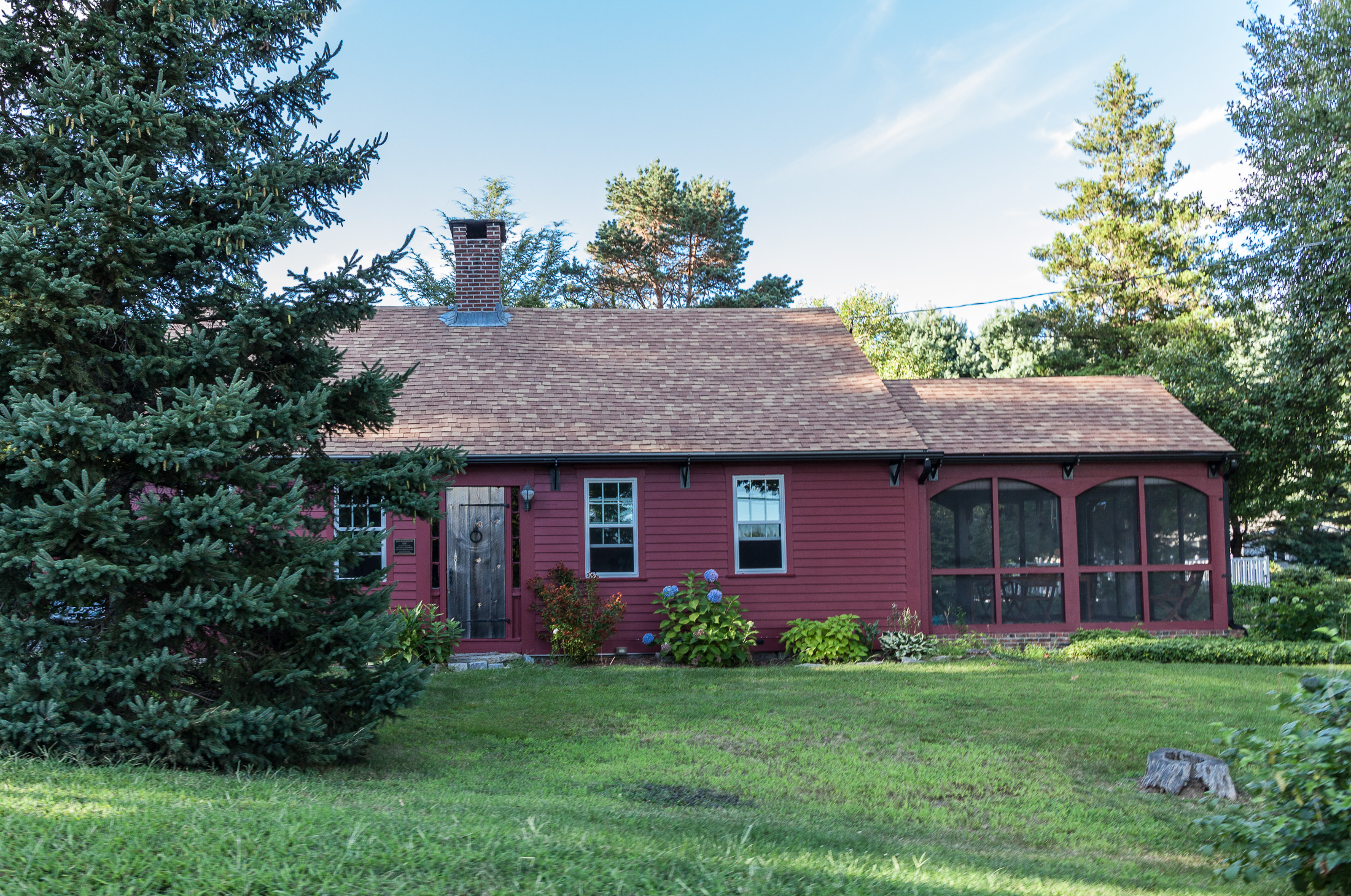
- Jenckes House on Jenckes Hill Road in 2013

- Location within Rhode Island Location within the United States
- Location: 81 Jenckes Hill Rd., Lincoln, Rhode Island
- Coordinates: 41°54′16″N 71°27′32″W
- Area: 1 acre (0.40 ha)
- Built: 1735
- MPS: Lincoln MRA
- NRHP reference No.: 84002019
- Added to NRHP: August 30, 1984

The Jenckes House is a historic house at 81 Jenckes Hill Road in Lincoln, Rhode Island. It is a 1 1/2-story wood-frame structure, five bays wide, with a central chimney. A 20th-century screened porch extends to the right side of the house, and a modern kitchen ell extends to the rear. The house is an 18th-century construction by a member of the locally prominent Jenckes family.

The house was listed on the National Register of Historic Places in 1984.

== See also ==
- Jenckes House (Old Louisquisset Pike, Lincoln, Rhode Island)
- National Register of Historic Places listings in Providence County, Rhode Island
