= Arthur Whipple Jenks =

Arthur Whipple Jenks (1863–1922) was an American Episcopal theologian.

Jenks was born at Concord, New Hampshire, and graduated from Dartmouth College in 1884 and from the General Theological Seminary in 1896. He received the degree of D.D. from Dartmouth in 1911. He published Notes for Meditation on the Beatitudes of the Psalter (1914). Arthur Whipple Jenks was a clergyman, ecclesiastical writer and historian.

Jenks was born to George Edwin Jenks, member of the N.H. State House of Representatives in 1873 and 1874. He was a descendant of one of the oldest and most distinguished families of Rhode Island (sp. variations Jenks, Jencks, Jenckes). His ancestors were members of the first Baptist church in America, established by Roger Williams, Providence, Rhode Island.
