= Frederick L. Jenks =

American academic (1942–2010)

Frederick Lynn "Rick" Jenks (January 3, 1942 – October 24, 2010) was a professor emeritus at Florida State University (FSU), having joined the faculty in 1971. As a member of the faculty of the College of Education, he designed and directed the internationally recognized doctoral and master's programs in Teaching English as a Second/Foreign Languages (TESL/TEFL), which he led for more than twenty years. Jenks served as major advisor for fifty doctoral dissertations and more than 300 master's degree recipients. He founded and directed The Center for Intensive English Studies (CIES) at FSU from 1979 to 2002. He was an adjunct professor at Flagler College, a Fulbright Senior Specialist, a legal expert witness in second language assessment and an advocate in the Florida legislature for public-school English language learners. He was born in Buffalo, New York.

In 1982, he designed and directed the first MA-TESOL program delivered by an American university totally outside the United States. Sponsored by ARAMCO, the Saudi Arabian oil company, the innovative program graduated 72 students during the five-year contract. He and Dr. James D. Brown, the program coordinator, were assisted by numerous TESOL experts including Drs. Stephen Gaies, Thomas Buckingham and David Eskey.

== Panama Canal Branch ==
From late 1996 through 2000, he was the director of Florida State University Panama Canal Branch campus in the Panama Canal Zone which, via a long-term contract with the U.S. Department of Defense, served as the Canal Zone's primary university, offering degree programs to military personnel and families, Canal Zone employees and residents, and Panamanian citizens. His mission was to seek ways for the university to continue operations after the reversion of the Canal Zone to the Republic of Panama in late 1999. The politically sensitive goal was achieved with support from the president and Legislative Assembly of Panama, USAID, Panamanian alumni and the U.S. Embassy. Former U.S. Ambassador to Panama, Simon Ferro, stated in 2000 that "The largest remaining U.S. footprints in the Republic of Panama are the Embassy and Florida State University-Panama." Jenks was instrumental in acquiring from the Panamanian government exclusive use of the former campus of the Panama Canal College, formerly the Canal Zone's community college. Today, FSU-Panama is chartered as a private Panamanian university, offering degree programs under an academic accord with FSU.

== Works ==
He was founding editor of the quarterly American Foreign Language Teacher from 1969 to 1974, edited twenty books and monographs on language education for Advancement Press of America, and served as editor of Heinle & Heinle's Foreign and Second Language Education series from 1978 to 1981.

His professional writing can be found in journals ranging from Classical Outlook to TESOL Journal, and in numerous books, festschrift and anthologies. A popular speaker, Jenks delivered over 100 keynote addresses and papers at international and national conferences.

A former member of the executive board of the American Council on the Teaching of Foreign Languages (ACTFL, NAFSA-ATESL, and chairman (1978) of the Southern Conference on Language Teaching, Jenks served on numerous committees of TESOL (Teachers of English to Speakers of Other Languages), ad was a founding member of TESOL International Research Foundation (TIRF). From 1987 to 2004, he was actively engaged as a member of several ETS-TOEFL committees including the Policy Council, research committee and TSE revision committee.

As an academic specialist for the U.S. Department of State, Jenks completed three assignments in the former Yugoslavia (1983, 1984, 1989) and one in East Germany (1991). In 1987, he was chosen as the first U.S. TEFL professor to offer in-service teacher training in the former Czechoslovakia after 31 years of USSR occupation. That same year, he was appointed distinguished visiting professor of English and international studies at the University of Tennessee, Martin. In 1993, he was selected as a Fulbright Senior Scholar at Universidad Autonoma de Heredia, Costa Rica, thereafter joining and chairing the Fulbright EFL Selection Committee.

Jenks was awarded the PhD by Wayne State University, having previously earned a Master of Arts degree from Case Western Reserve University (1966) and the Bachelor of Arts in modern languages from Grove City College in 1963. Jenks received the Heinle & Heinle Award for Excellence in Teaching from the Teachers of English to Speakers of Other Languages (TESOL) in 2002.

== Personal ==
Jenks lived in Tallahassee with his wife, Lynn Priestley, a noted regional landscape artist. He died at a Tallahassee hospice in 2010.
