= Jenckes House (Old Louisquisset Pike, Lincoln, Rhode Island) =

Historic house in Rhode Island, United States

- U.S. National Register of Historic Places
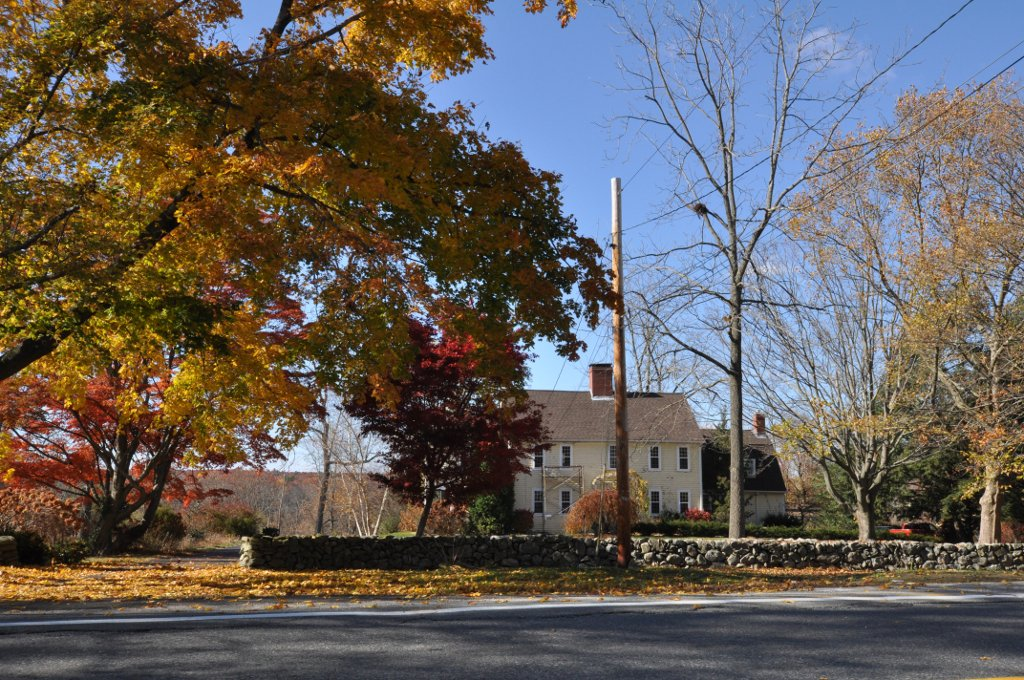

- Location within Rhode Island Location within the United States
- Location: Lincoln, Rhode Island
- Coordinates: 41°53′44″N 71°26′55″W
- Built: 1760
- MPS: Lincoln MRA
- NRHP reference No.: 84000088
- Added to NRHP: October 10, 1984

The Jenckes House is a historic house at 1730 Old Louisquisset Pike in Lincoln, Rhode Island, United States. It is a 2 1/2-story timber-frame structure, five bays wide, with a large central chimney. The main entrance is flanked by pilasters and topped by a transom window and heavy molded cap. Additions extend the house to the south and northwest. The main block is estimated to have been built around 1760, by a member of the locally prominent Jenckes family.

The house was listed on the National Register of Historic Places in 1984.

== See also ==
- Jenckes House (Jenckes Hill Road, Lincoln, Rhode Island)
- National Register of Historic Places listings in Providence County, Rhode Island
