= Jeremiah Jenks =

American economist, educator, and professor (1856–1929)

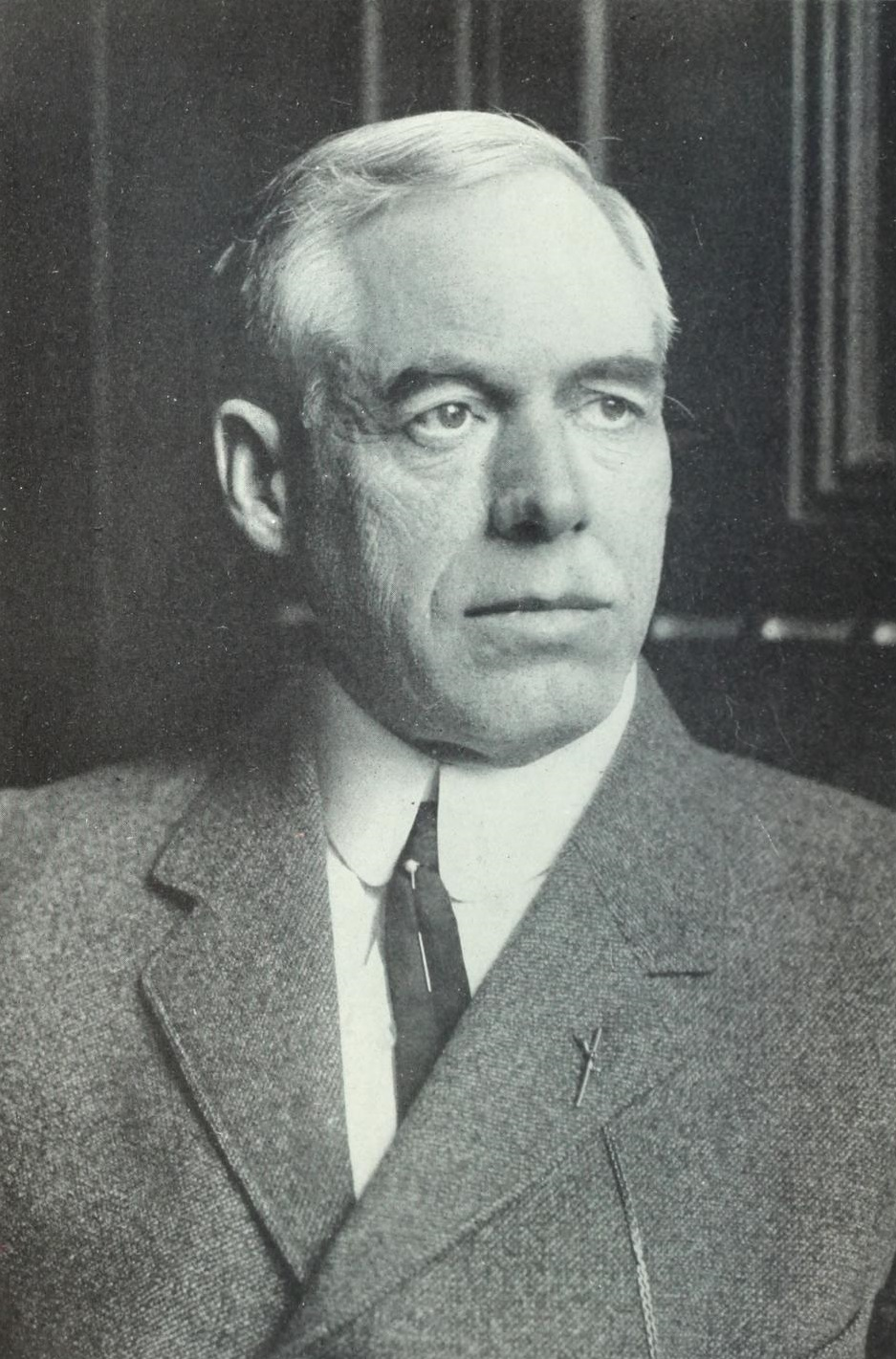
- Jenks in c. 1912
- Born: September 2, 1856; St. Clair, Michigan
- Died: August 24, 1929 (aged 72); New York City
- Occupations: Economist, educator, professor

Jeremiah Whipple Jenks (September 2, 1856 – August 24, 1929) was an American economist, educator, and professor at Cornell University, who held various posts in the United States government throughout his career. He served as a member of the Dillingham Immigration Commission from 1907 to 1914 in which he led research projects on the state of immigration to the US.

He authored several influential works, including The Immigration Problem: A Study of Immigration Conditions and Needs and Dictionary of Races or Peoples. He was among the first social science academics within government and one of the first to propose that the federal government has the power to restrict immigration.

== Biography ==
Born in St. Clair, Michigan, Jenks graduated from the University of Michigan in 1878 with an A.B. degree and in 1879 with a A.M. degree. He then went on to study law while teaching at Mount Morris College in Illinois, and was admitted to the Michigan bar in 1881. He later studied in Germany, earning his doctorate from the University of Halle under Johannes Conrad in 1885. Jenks held professorships at both Cornell University (1891–1912) as a member of the President White School of History and Political Science and New York University (1912 onward).

He began his career in service for the federal government as a tax commissioner in New York City, and soon moved onto hold various posts within the federal government. Theodore Roosevelt appointed him in 1899 to be an "expert in Asia" for the US Treasury, and represented the US in financial matters within several Asian countries. Jenks soon became an advisor to Mexico, Nicaragua, and Germany as well, quickly advancing through the ranks of the federal government. Jenks was appointed a member of the US Commission on International Exchange, and was appointed to the Dillingham Commission in 1907. The National Civic Federation, an organization of big business owners and labor organizers, also hired him and his work there became inspirational for his studies on labor. Jenks was recognized with the Silver Buffalo Award in 1926. Today, he is remembered for his association with Nobel laureate Friedrich Hayek, and his legacy in American immigration policy.

== Economics ==
Jenks was interested in the political aspects of economic problems and he served frequently on various government commissions and made many reports on currency, labor, and immigration issues. Jenks was part of the new school of economic theory during the Progressive Era, which stemmed through his dissertation adviser at the University of Halle, Joseph Conrad, who was an outspoken critic of British classical economics. Progressive Era economists focused on making economics compatible with morality, and sought to institute governmental regulations which were favorable to large corporations. Jenks toured the world for the War Department from 1901 to 1902, where he examined how dependent colonial governments operated financially. He made many other trips around the world as a member of the Commission on International Exchange, where he researched colonial policy and the gold standard in countries all over the world. Based on these experiences, Jenks wrote a chapter in Senator Henry Cabot Lodge's book Colonies of the World. Progressive economists and Jenks founded the American Economic Association, where he served as president from 1906 to 1907. One of the association's goals was the "development of legislative policy", which was radical for its time as many of the old school economists of the time still strongly believed in the idea of strict laissez-faire economics.

The reformist ideology of the American Economic Association affected his work as a member of the National Civic Federation (NCF). The National Civic Federation was a business-dominated organization that aligned with the ideologies of reformist minded economists like Jenks, as it sought to implement uniform state legislation on multiple issues including worker's compensation, child labor, and taxation. Additionally, the NCF gave Jenks his first exposure to immigration issues, as in 1905 he attended a conference that focused on whether immigrant labor from China should be more restricted. He also served as an economic adviser at the Paris Peace Conference in 1919. Jenks’ experiences abroad influenced his views on US colonialism. Although many Republican reformers were anti-imperialist, Jenks was an outspoken proponent of US colonialism and expansion. He saw American colonial intervention as a way to offset inefficiencies produced by the native populations, and a way to bring them to the moral standards of America. Jenks' experiences abroad also gave him the idea that the US had the right to exercise federal power across the globe, particularly when it came to immigration.

== Politics ==
In the Progressive Era, Jeremiah Jenks was one of the pioneers who set the precedent for the inclusion of professors and academic experts in government. In 1899, Jenks was appointed as an "expert in Asia" for the US Treasury, and began traveling to various dependent countries around the world. Jenks' experience in politics stemmed from his involvement in various economic and immigration research organizations. As a member of the NCF, Jenks helped to draft a bill to amend the Sherman Antitrust Act in 1908. Although the bill was ultimately unsuccessful, Jenks sat on the four-man committee headed by John Bates Clark which drafted a preliminary version of the 1914 Clayton Antitrust Act. With the Dillingham Commission, he wrote model legislation for the Mann Act of 1910, which focused on the restriction of white slavery and sex trafficking into the United States. Jenks was instrumental in the writing and the passage of the Dillingham Immigration Bill of 1911, which was ultimately vetoed by President William Howard Taft. However, this bill was one of the first to restrict immigration on racial grounds, and set the precedent for many restrictionist policies which were soon to be passed by the federal government, such as the Johnson–Reed Act of 1924. In 1916, Jenks was also included on a committee led by Sidney Gulick, which sought to end the disproportionate discrimination in the immigration of citizens of Asian countries, and proposed a new model for immigration restrictions. In reality, their proposed plan still instituted quotas for different immigrants based on race, it would just be less exclusionary for members of Asian countries. Throughout his years involved in immigration policy, Jenks gave talks and held conferences on what he termed the racial problem of immigration.

=== Dillingham Commission ===
Jenks' most influential and lasting work for the federal government came from his membership in the Dillingham Commission from 1907 to 1911. The commission was progressive minded, and was headed by Senator William P. Dillingham, although most of the power rested with Lodge and Jenks. The commission was convened after the failure of the implementation of a literacy test by Congress to limit immigration, and sought to conduct academic research to influence policy on the restriction of immigration. The commission was also formed out of a growing negative sentiment towards immigrants, as a majority of the population growth in the US in this period was result of immigration, and immigrants were increasingly coming from countries in Eastern and Southern Europe. Jenks was instrumental to the work, as he did much of the hiring for the commission and led many of the research projects that the Commission undertook. He applied his experiences abroad in different colonies across the world, as he increasingly thought it was the duty of the federal government to place restrictions on immigration into the US. For his first research project for the commission, Jenks traveled to San Diego to study the urban congestion of Mexican immigrants. It was on this journey that Jenks realized he could enjoy complete autonomy in his research, as he received no interference from the federal government. He then led many studies on the urban congestion, living conditions, and occupations of immigrants from different so-called "races".

Jenks was also concerned with the effect of immigrants on American morality and hired many women to investigate this effect, particularly in the field of white slavery, or human trafficking. These studies led by Jenks and the commission were noted to not conform to research methods as they did not hold any public hearings, nor cross-examine any witnesses. The commission also did not utilize any data already available to them, such as census reports, studies by state bureaus of labor, or other agencies, in order to come up with their own unique conclusions. Instead, it relied heavily on the works of Lodge and Jenks to create their own tables, explanations, and conclusions.

The Commission concluded with a 41-volume report in 1911 which outlined the current status of immigration, laying out the differences in occupation, crime, and many other things between races of immigrants. This study ultimately labeled some races of immigrants as more desirable than others, and ultimately called for a quota system which would restrict different immigrants based on their desirability. Although the commission's proposed bill was vetoed by President Taft in 1911, the research of the commission was instrumental in the passage of many immigration restrictions in the years to come, including the Johnson–Reed Act of 1924. Scholar Mae Ngai notes the racial aspects of this legislation, as she says the language of eugenics dominated the political discourse on immigration during this period. The Commission divided the immigrants they studied by ethnicity and race, thus showing how they fed into the language of eugenics and the ideology of the National Origins Act of 1924. All of this work by the Commission set the precedent of restricting immigration into the United States as a necessary duty of the federal government.

=== Scout Oath and Scout Law ===
A committee under Jenks with other prominent educators drew up the Scout Oath and Scout Law for the Boy Scouts of America. The principal differences from the originals suggested by Robert Baden-Powell, the founder of Scouting, were the addition to the Scout Oath of the sentence "to keep myself physically strong, mentally awake and morally straight" and of three additional points to the Scout Law – "A Scout is brave", "A Scout is clean", and "A Scout is reverent".

In 1912, Baden-Powell adopted "A Scout is clean in thought, word and deed" as a tenth law to his own original nine.

== Works ==
=== The Immigration Problem: A Study of American Immigration Conditions and Needs ===
One of Jenks' most influential publications was written with the help of his hire for the Dillingham Commission, William Jett Lauck. It was a research study conducted on different races of immigrants in US society with the goals of fixing a standard of civilization for the US, securing all the facts about immigration, measuring immigrants' influence on the standard of civilization, and suggesting measures for the US government to implement to correct these problems. Jenks and Lauck conduct research studies on criminal immigrants, human trafficking, and immigrant living conditions over the US. After studying a mine in northern Pennsylvania, they came to the conclusion that immigrants were reducing the standard of civilization for all Americans, which was to negatively affect their morality. They also conducted studies on the difference in occupation of immigrants from different countries, and concluded that they had negative impact on labor unions, as they were frequently employed as strikebreakers.

In the section entitled "Are Other Races Inferior?", Jenks questions the idea of inferior races of immigrants. He states, "... whether or not we ourselves believe that race prejudice is something to be heartily condemned, we must still recognize this feeling as an important political fact." Jenks comes to the conclusion that racial prejudice is not a personal issue, but a political one. The book concludes that pre-war immigration was too large for the economic welfare of the US, and a new naturalization law was required. Jenks and Lauck's perspective on racial prejudice was relevant in the policy suggestions of the book, which suggested different quotas for different races of immigrants, as some were easier to be trained and assimilated into American society. This book was one of the first to advocate immigration restriction by federal government legislation. It is also important because it was the first to coin the term "the immigration problem", a phrase which is still used in the US government today.

Jenks and Lauck argued that immigration adversely affects economic outcomes for native-born Americans. A 2019 study by several economic historians found that the immigration restrictions that Jenks advocated for did not improve economic outcomes for native-born Americans.

=== Dictionary of Races or Peoples ===
Jenks and his key staff assistant, anthropologist Daniel Folkmar, collaborated on an extensive racial dictionary that became an important feature of the commission's report to Congress.

In their Dictionary of Races or Peoples, Jenks and Folkmar stated that their principal task was to discover "whether there may not be certain races that are inferior to other races... to show whether some may be better fitted for American citizenship than others." The dictionary, along with other Commission reports, was cited frequently in subsequent immigration debates.

== Selected publications ==
His works include:

- The Trust Problem (1900)
- Principles of Politics (1909)
- Governmental Action for Social Welfare (1910)
- The Immigration Problem: A Study of American Immigration Conditions and Needs (with William Jett Lauck, 1911)
- Dictionary of Races or Peoples (with Daniel Folkmar, 1911)

== See also ==
- Money doctor
