= Karel de Bazel =

Dutch architect and designer (1869–1923)

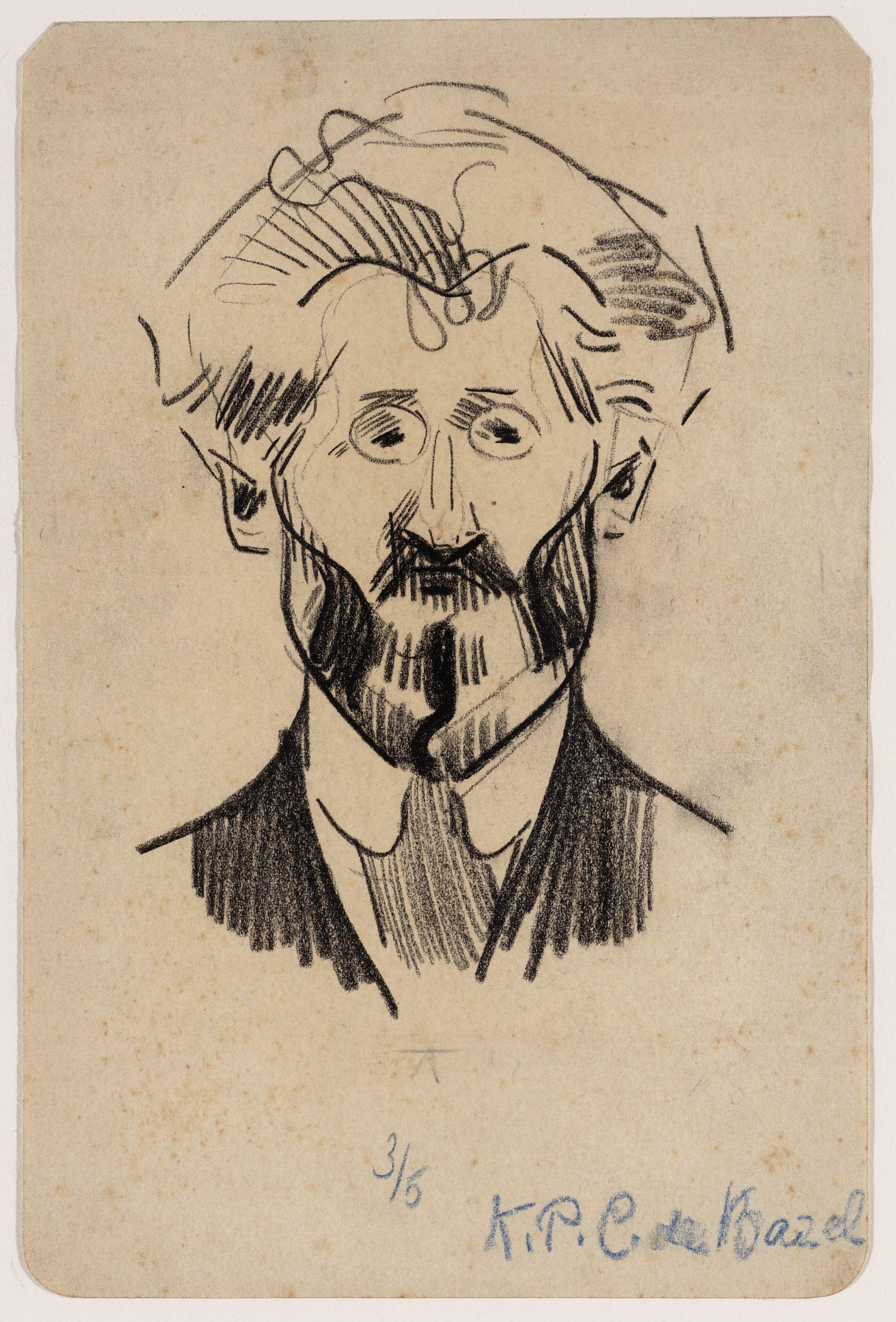
- De Bazel drawn in 1915 by Martin Monnickendam
- Born: 14 February 1869; Den Helder
- Died: 28 November 1923 (aged 54); Amsterdam
- Occupations: architect, engraver, engineer, furniture designer, textile designer, glass designer and bookbinding designer
- Buildings: De Bazel – Nederlandsche Handel-Maatschappij office in Amsterdam De Bazel – head office Nederlandsche Heidemaatschappij in Arnhem

Karel Petrus Cornelis de Bazel (Den Helder, 14 February 1869—Amsterdam, 28 November 1923) was a modern Dutch architect, engraver, draftsman, furniture designer, carpet designer, glass artist and bookbinding designer. He was the teacher of Adriaan Frederik van der Weij and the first chairman of the Bond van Nederlandse Architecten (BNA; the Association of Dutch Architects), beginning in 1909.

== Life and career ==
=== Youth, Training, and Early Career, 1869–1900 ===
Karel de Bazel was the son of Karel Pieter Cornelis de Bazel, caretaker of the Ministry of Marine, and Petronella Elisabeth Koch. De Bazel came from a modest background and his formal education as a youth only extended through primary school. Much later, De Bazel began his career as an apprentice to a carpenter.

De Bazel took evening courses in architecture at the Koninklijke Academie van Beeldende Kunsten (Royal Academy of Visual Arts) in The Hague, and then took a job as a draftsman at the Nieukerken architectural firm in The Hague in 1888. In 1889, through his brother, who worked as a French translator at a publishing house in Leiden, De Bazel found work as a draftsman for prominent Dutch architect P.J.H. Cuypers in Amsterdam. During this period he executed perspective drawings of St. Vitus' Church in Hilversum and St. Bavo's Cathedral in Haarlem, which so impressed Cuypers that he first promoted De Bazel to head draftsman and later his chief designer, overseeing the rest of the firm. But after De Bazel became a member of the Theosofische Vereniging (Theosophical Society) in 1894, he left Cuypers' firm, as his employer was Catholic. In 1895, De Bazel and Johannes Ludovicus Mathieu Lauweriks formed their own independent partnership. Between 1897 and 1902 the duo taught courses alongside H. J. M. Walenkamp in the new Theosophical Vahânaloge they had founded in Amsterdam the previous year in drawing, art history and aesthetics; the institution operated until 1931. Here they made connections between architecture, mathematics, nature, and the cosmos. Bazel was a member of Nederlandsche Vereeniging voor Ambachts- en Nijverheidskunst (V.A.N.K.) the Dutch Association for Craft and Craft Art.

=== Mature architectural work, 1900–23 ===
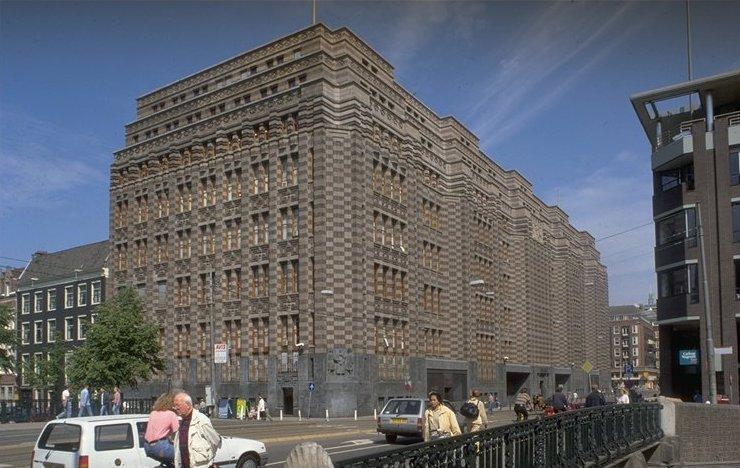
The De Bazel building, former headquarters of the Nederlandsche Handel-Maatschappij and later ABN-Amro bank, has housed the Amsterdam City Archives since 2007. Photo: bma.amsterdam.nl.

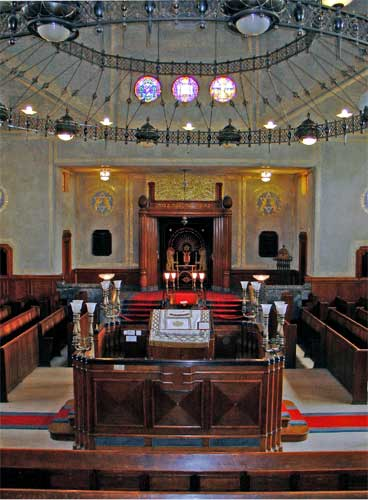
Interior of the Synagogue of Enschede.

In 1904 De Bazel founded the famous Amsterdam furniture studio De Ploeg with his brother-in-law Kees Oosschot and Klaas van Leeuwen. Along with Hendrik Petrus Berlage, he pioneered the Dutch architectural rationalism that would become characteristic of national practice during and after the First World War. His designs also began to be influenced by Eastern architecture.

During this period, De Bazel executed numerous designs around and for the municipality of Bussum. The first of these was De Bazel's model farm Oud Bussem (1903), located on the eponymous estate in the Gooi. This complex was founded by a wealthy student in response to an outbreak of typhus that had contaminated fresh milk that had been sold nationwide. Both Berlage and Willem Marinus Dudok praised this design, calling it De Bazel's best work. In 1921, he was commissioned by the municipality of Bussum design a new residential area, the Brediuskwartier, which remains one of the most beautiful and completely remaining examples of a residential neighborhood in the style of the Amsterdam School style in the Netherlands. On 17 November 2006, the district was officially designated by the government as a protected townscape. He also designed a park and workers' housing in Bussum, and other residential districts for workers and bourgeois clients alike in Eindhoven and Dieren, and between 1913 and 1923 De Bazel also designed several blocks of workers' housing in the Spaarndammerbuurt west of the center of Amsterdam.

In 1905 De Bazel also designed an octagonal-plan World Capital complex, including a Peace Palace and three academies, for the Foundation for Internationalism just outside The Hague, which, however, was never executed, except for the Peace Palace. Similarly, in 1907, he designed a new district in the foothills of Semarang in the Dutch East Indies (now Indonesia) for his friend, the colonial pharmacist and activist Hendrik Tillema. This district was supposed to be used to improve the health and living conditions of the native Javanese in the city, which caused the colonial government to oppose its implementation until it was extensively modified by Thomas Karsten a decade later to serve as a gentrified district for the city's wealth Dutch and Chinese elite instead. Berlage included De Bazel's designs in his 1908 Expansion Plan for The Hague but this was never directly realized, either.

Other works from this period include the building for the Nederlandse Heidemaatschappij (a Dutch environmental and infrastructure consulting and engineering firm, now called Arcadis) in Arnhem, built from 1912 to 1914, which was the first large-scale structure in the Netherlands to make use of reinforced concrete. The structure is now called the De Bazel after him.

De Bazel also worked on the designs for a glass factory in Leerdam, which beginning in 1915 engaged several artists to design utilitarian and decorative products, among them Berlage and Frank Lloyd Wright.

Late in life, De Bazel designed his most famous work, the headquarters for the Nederlandsche Handel-Maatschappij (NHM; Dutch Trading Company), built from 1919 to 1926 at Vijzelstraat 32 in Amsterdam, where he also designed much of the interior. The former office building is often colloquially referred to as De Bazel in his honor, and since 2007 has housed the Amsterdam City Archives. He also, significantly, designed the synagogue of Enschede, which was completed posthumously.

=== Other design work ===
De Bazel was also involved in designing furniture and utensils. Well-known examples of this are the cradle he made for Princess Juliana of the Netherlands in 1909 and a Pulchikast that he designed for the occasion of the marriage of Queen Wilhelmina to Prince Hendrik in 1901.

De Bazel also designed the stamps issued in honor of the centenary of the Kingdom of the Netherlands in 1913, which depicted the queen and her three predecessors.

=== Death ===
Karel de Bazel died aboard a train from his home in Bussum to Amsterdam, ironically en route to the funeral of his fellow accomplished Dutch architect Michel de Klerk (who had died four days earlier), as a result of a lung condition. He was buried at Westerveld Cemetery in Driehuis.

== Works ==
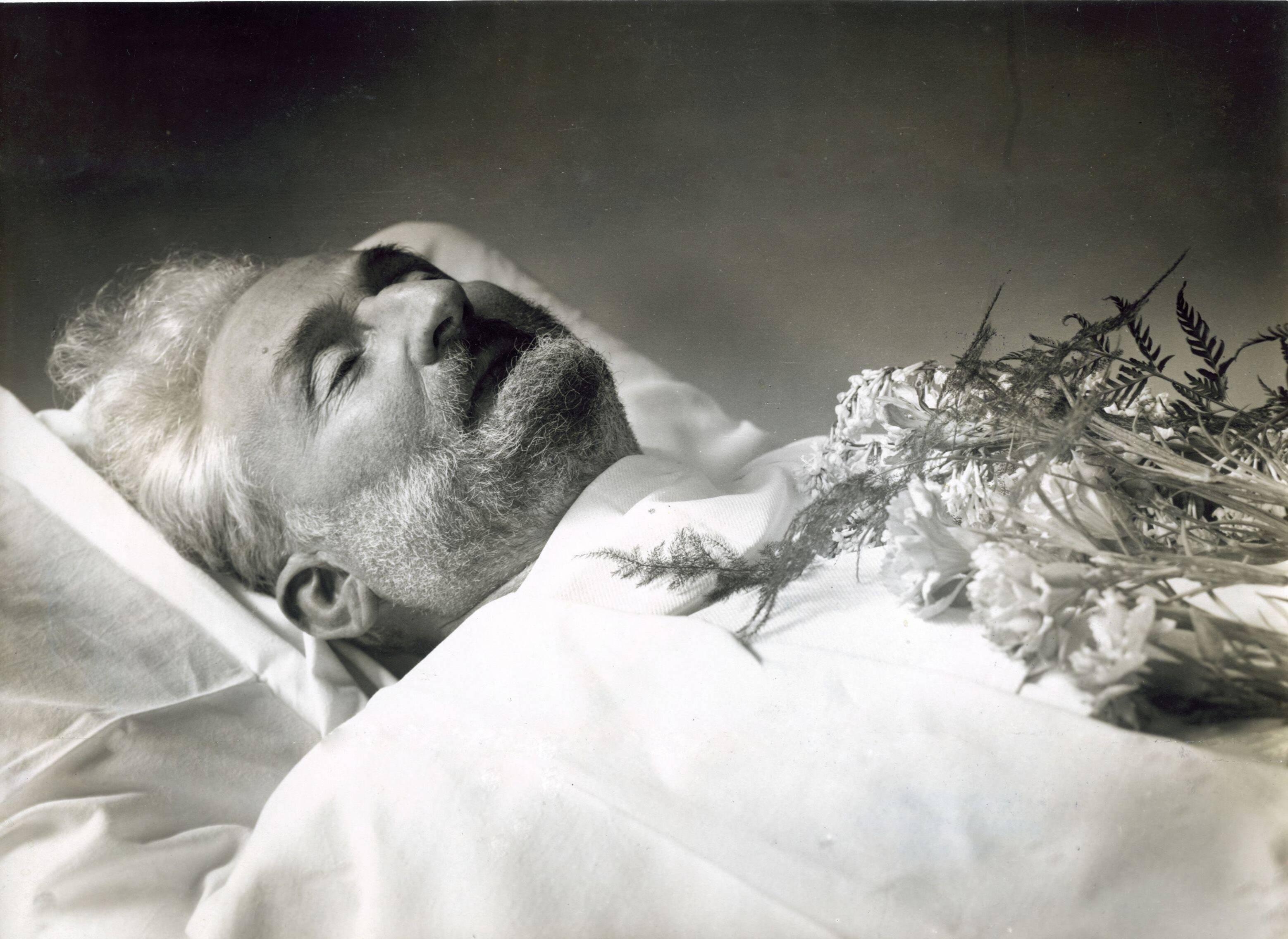
Karel de Bazel lying in state for his funeral, November 1923.

=== Architectural ===
- Project for Saint Bavo's Cathedral in Haarlem (1890)
- Saint Vitus Church and ministers' residence in Hilversum (1891—92; for PJH Cuypers)
- De Bremstruik ("The Broomstick") villa for KJL Alberdingk Thijm, in Baarn (1900—01)
- Office building for Joannes van Woensel Kooy at Flevolaan 67, Huizen (1903)
- Hofstede dairy farm, Naarden (1904)
- Houses at Koningslaan 14 and 16, Amsterdam (1904)
- Moltzer-Boeke House, Wilhelminalaan 4, Alkmaar (1904—05)
- Ideal project for the "World Capital" at The Hague (1905—06)
- Woudoord villa in Oranjewoud, Heerenveen (1908)
- Restoration of the Rembrandt House, Jodenbreestraat 4, Amsterdam (1908—11)
- Villa at Beethovenlaan 29, Hilversum (1910)
- Heerenpoort railway station in Leiden (1911)
- CJ and J. Pabst House, Steenbergen 6, Laren (1911)
- Villa Meentwijck, Groot Hertoginnelaan 34A, Bussum (1912)
- JC Loman House, Johannes Vermeerstraat 14, Amsterdam (1912)
- Project for Rotterdam City Hall (1912—13)
- Nederlandse Heidemaatschappij in Arnhem (1912—14)
- House at Dam 81, Amsterdam (1913)
- De Boschkamp Farm greenhouse and coachhouse (1913)
- Villa at Oudwijkerlaan 47, Utrecht (1914)
- Steens Zijnen House, Van Lawick van Pabststraat 31, Arnhem (1916)
- Redelé villa at Parklaan 56, Eindhoven (1916)
- Workers' houses in the Spaarndammerbuurt in Amsterdam (1918—23)
- De Wyk villa for G. Mesdag, Haren (1919)
- Office building for the Nederlandsche Handel-Maatschappij in Amsterdam (1919—26)
- New residential area, the Brediuskwartier, in Bussum (1921)
- Sliedrecht Town Hall (1921—23)
- Synagogue of Enschede (after 1923)
- Workers' housing complex at Rijswijkseweg 340, The Hague (1923—25)

=== Other design work ===
- Stamp design for Amsterdam City Archives, ca. 1900
- Cover for Wendingen, vol. 2, no. 1 (January 1919)

== Gallery ==
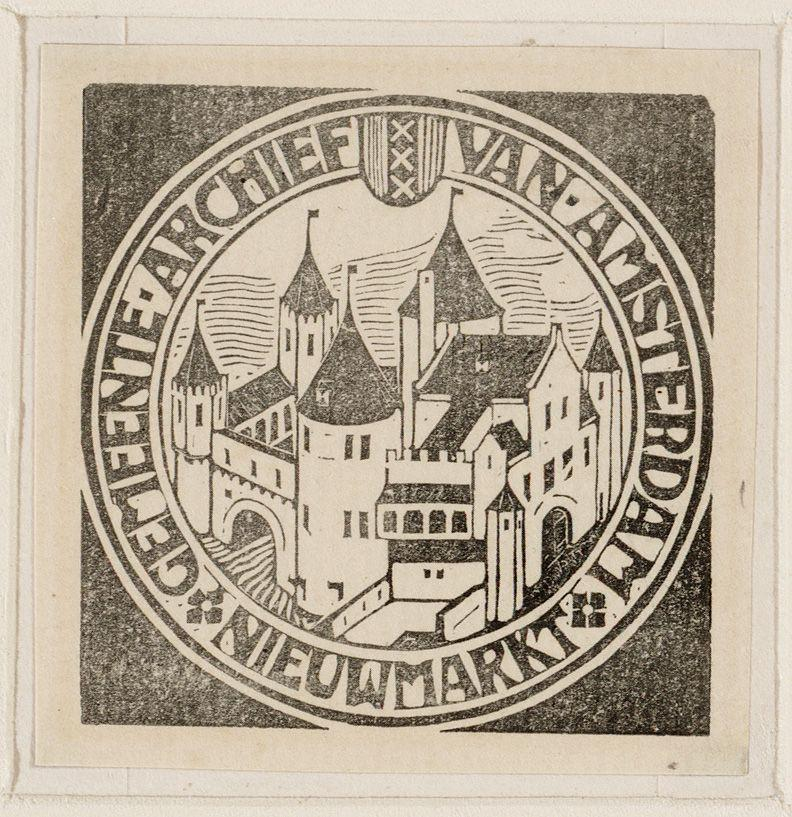
Stamp design for the Amsterdam City Archives, ca. 1900

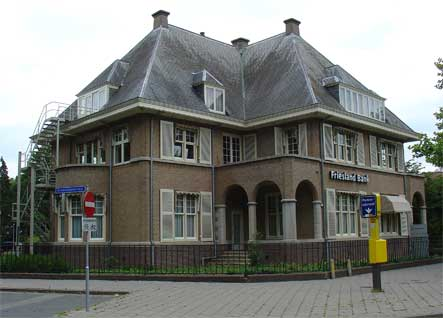
Menko-van-Dam house in Enschede

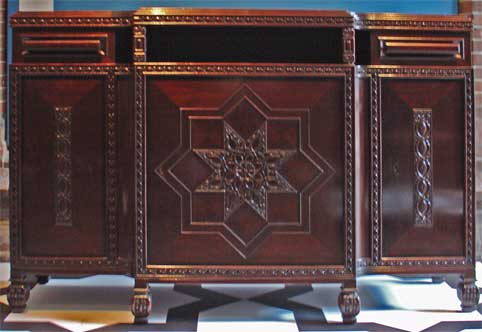
Cupboard for the Menko-van Dams

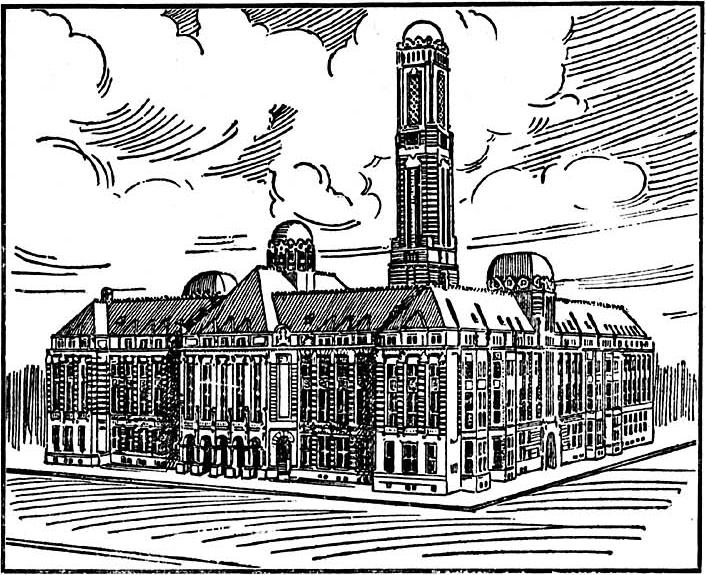
Competition design for Rotterdam City Hall, 1912–13

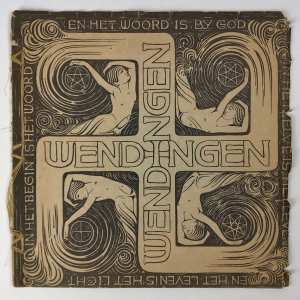
Cover for Wendingen, January 1919

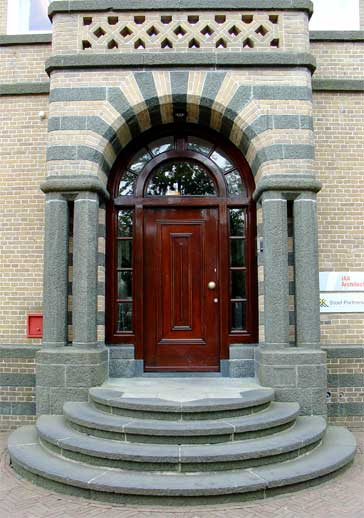
Entrance to a villa in Enschede

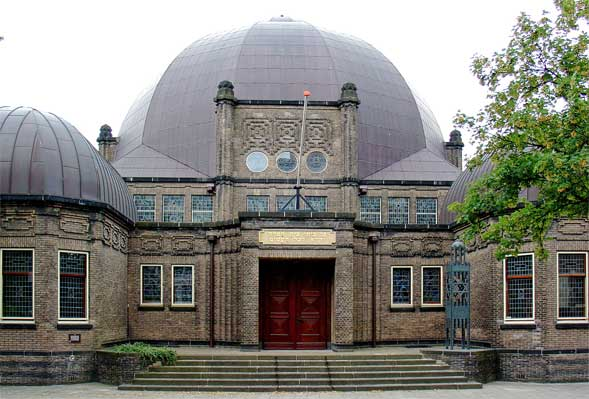
Synagogue in Enschede

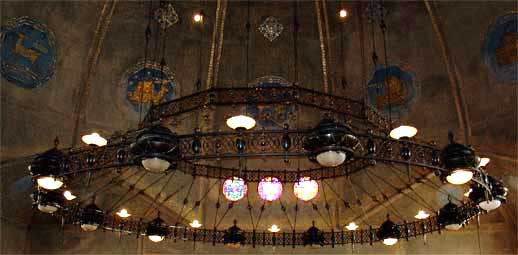
Lamp in the synagogue of Enschede

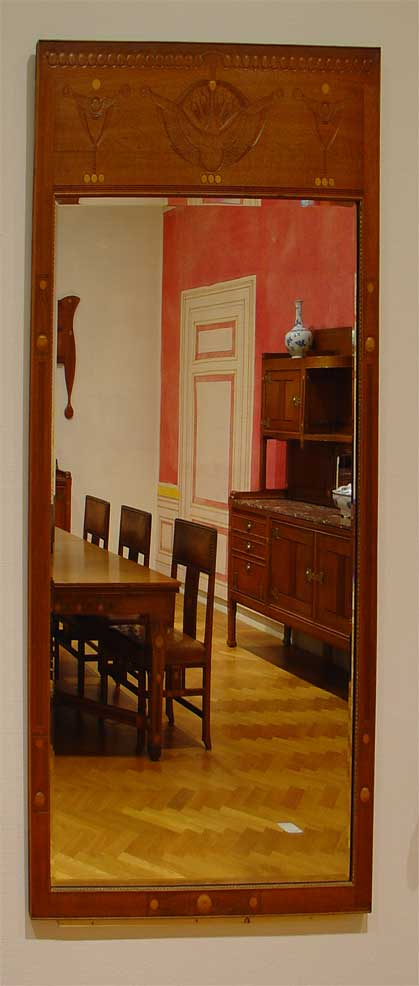
Dining room for the Schuurman-Gentis family

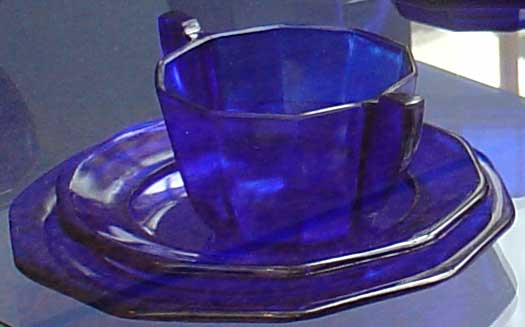
Examples from glass service from the Leerdam glass factory

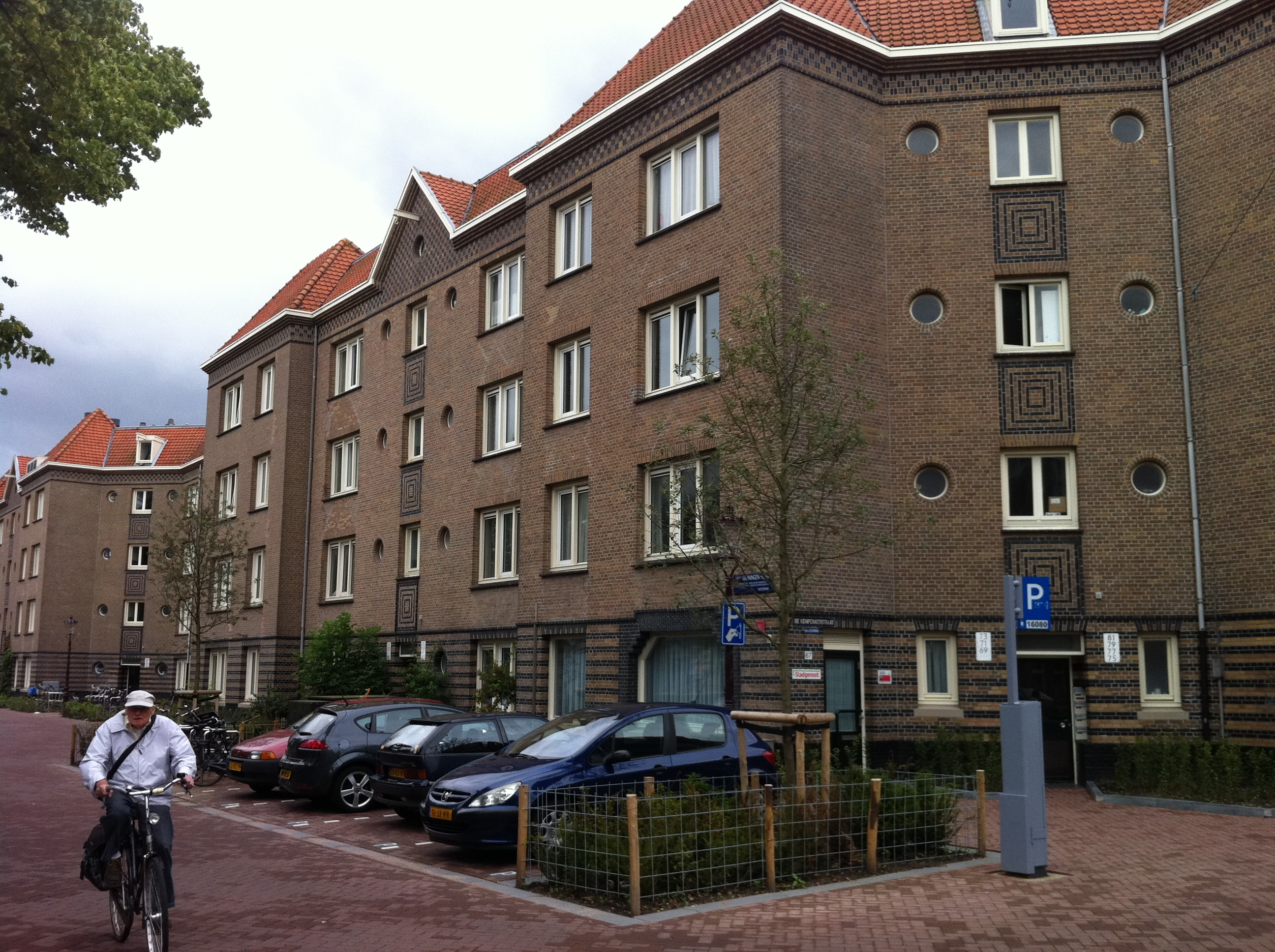
Workers' homes Van Beuningenplein Amsterdam-West

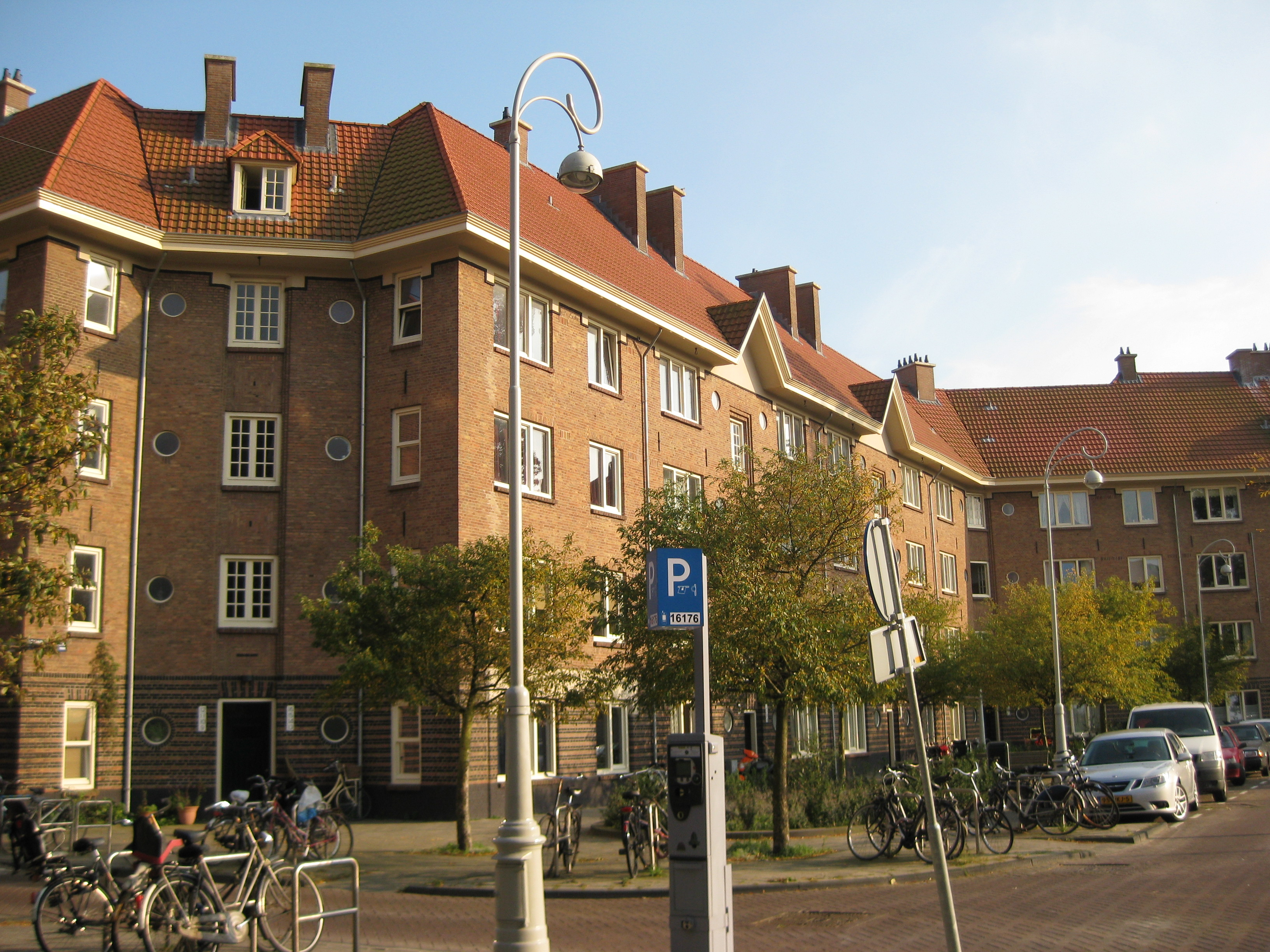
Identical design of workers' housing in Zaandammerplein, Amsterdam-West

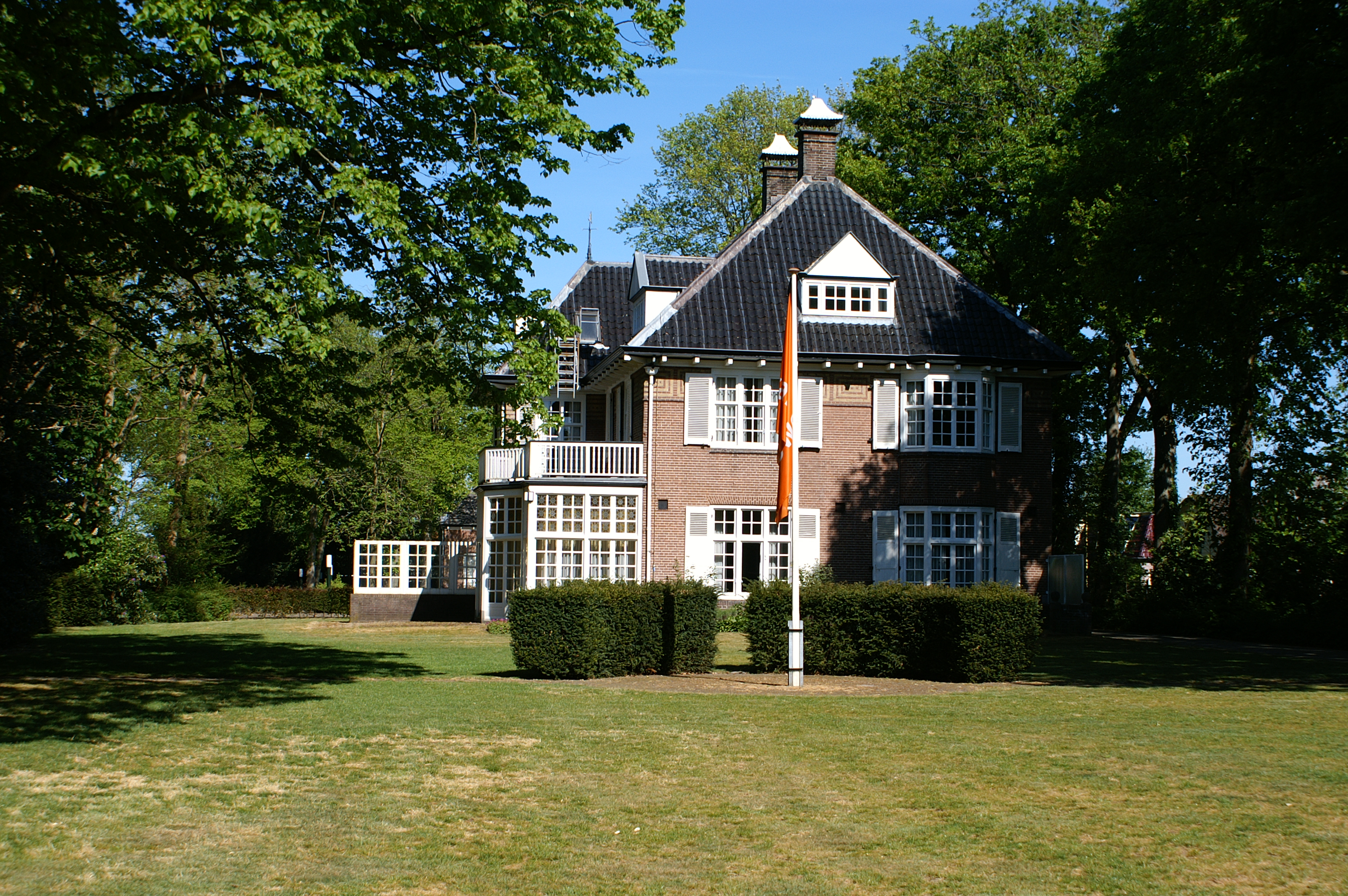
Woudoord villa in Oranjewoud, Heerenveen (1908)

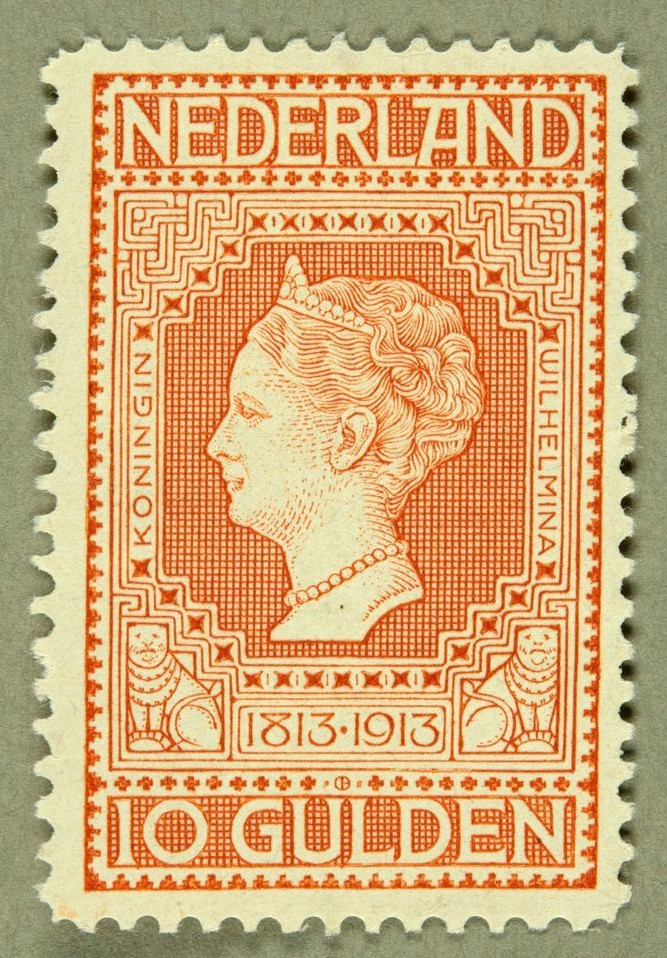
Wilhelmina stamp (1913)

== See also ==
- List of Dutch architects
- Modern architecture
- Expressionist architecture
- Amsterdam School
- Architecture of the Netherlands
