= Basil (disambiguation) =

Basil is the common name of a number of plants often used for seasoning. It is typically used for a number of species of the genus Ocimum, in particular the widely cultivated O. basilicum.

Basil may also refer to:

- Clinopodium vulgare, another species of plant within the Lamiaceae family commonly known as wild basil.
- Basil (name), people named Basil
- Basil, California, former name of Redwood Valley, California
- Basil (novel), by Wilkie Collins
- Basil (film), a 1998 film by Radha Bharadwaj starring Jared Leto
- Basil (Sesame Park), the main character on the Canadian children's show Sesame Park
- Basil Fawlty, the main character in Fawlty Towers
- Saint Basil (disambiguation)
- The Great Mouse Detective, also known as Basil the Great Mouse Detective, an animated film by Disney
- A type of leather tanned with redoul
- Basil Brush, fox puppet from British children's TV

== See also ==
- Basel, Switzerland
- Basal (disambiguation), referring to a base or minimum level
- Basilica (disambiguation)
- Bazel (disambiguation)
- Vasily (disambiguation), the Slavic form of the name
