= Nederlandsche Handel-Maatschappij =

Dutch trading company

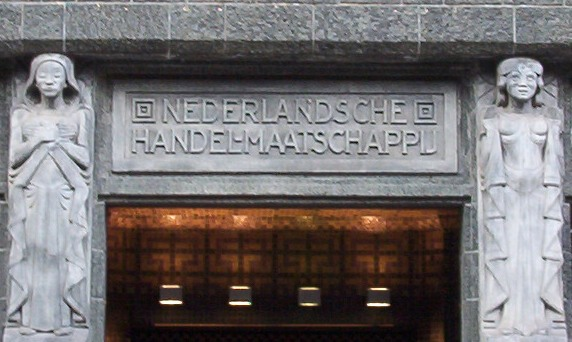
"Nederlandsche Handel-Maatschappij" above the entrance to the Amsterdam Archives at the De Bazel building, built as NHM's headquarters

The Nederlandsche Handel-Maatschappij N.V. (NHM, lit. 'Dutch Trade Society') was a Dutch trading and financial company, established in 1824, in The Hague by King William I to promote and develop trade, shipping and agriculture. For the next 140 years the NHM developed a large international branch network and increasingly engaged in banking operations. In 1964, it merged with Twentsche Bank to form Algemene Bank Nederland, itself a predecessor of ABN AMRO.

== History ==
The NHM was a private company which issued publicly traded shares. According to the king, the NHM would act to leverage economic activity and encourage the development of national wealth. However, in practice it came down to expanding existing trade, by gathering data and searching for new markets as well as financing industry and shipping. Its close association with the Dutch government meant it played an important role in the development of trade between the Netherlands and the Dutch East Indies. Its former headquarters in De Bazel in Amsterdam houses the Amsterdam Archives today.

The NHM is sometimes called the successor of the Dutch East India Company or VOC, as it was also a private company that issued shares and financed trade with the Dutch East Indies. The establishment of the NHM can be seen as an attempt to bring new impetus to trade with the Dutch East Indies after the depression of the years of French domination (1795–1814), and the final collapse of the VOC two decades earlier. With playful reference to the greatness of the VOC, the NHM was colloquially known as Kompenie Ketjil or the "little company".

The NHM financing of trade and shipping led to the development of a network of branches which increasingly engaged in financing and banking operations. The network extended throughout South East Asia and on the trade routes between the Netherlands and the Dutch East Indies and the NHM continued to extend its network into the 20th century. It lost a number of its branches when the Indonesian government nationalised them in 1960 to form a new locally owned bank, but by then had branches in many other parts of the world.

=== Time line ===
- 1824: King William I created the Nederlandsche Handel-Maatschappij (NHM) by Royal Decree to revive trade between the Netherlands and the Netherlands East Indies.
- 1826: NHM opened an office in Batavia (now Jakarta), known as De Factorij
- 1858: NHM opened a branch in Singapore
- 1870s: NHM expands its overseas activities into banking
- 1888: NHM opened a branch in Penang
- 1902: NHM starts banking operations in the Netherlands
- 1906: NHM opened a branch in Hong Kong
- 1920: NHM opened branches in Bombay (Mumbai) and Calcutta (Kolkata) primarily to work with clients in the diamond business
- 1926: NHM opened a branch in Jeddah, Saudi Arabia. Known later as the Saudi Hollandi Bank (currently Alawwal Bank), it was the first, and until 1948 the only, commercial bank in the Kingdom. The branch existed to serve the needs of Indonesian Muslims coming to perform Hajj, the pilgrimage to Mecca
- 1934: Financial restructuring; NHM reduces its capital by 75 percent
- 1936: NHM initiates a retail presence in the Netherlands beyond its previous branches in Amsterdam, The Hague, and Rotterdam, by acquiring the Guelders Credit Union (Dutch: Geldersche Credietvereeniging)
- 1941: NHM opened an agency in New York City
- 1948: NHM opened a branch in Karachi to become the first foreign bank to receive a banking license from the new government of Pakistan
- 1949: NHM acquired De Surinaamsche Bank
- 1951: NHM opened branches in Mombasa (Kenya), and Dar-es-Salaam (Tanganyika)
- 1954: NHM opened a branch in Beirut (Lebanon), and one in Kampala (Uganda)
- 1959: The Indonesian government nationalized NHM's plantations
- 1960: The Indonesian government nationalized NHM's banking operations into Bank Ekspor Impor Indonesia, later Bank Mandiri
- 1963: NHM set up its Malaysian head office in Kuala Lumpur
- 1964: NHM merged with De Twentsche Bank to form Algemene Bank Nederland (ABN)

== Buildings ==
The building at Vijzelstraat 32 in Amsterdam known today as "De Bazel"is named after its architect Karel de Bazel. It was originally built in 1919–1926 for the NHM and it is decorated with many details reminiscent of Indonesia, most notably the brickwork, which earned the building the nickname "spekkoek" It was later repurposed as the Amsterdam Archives.

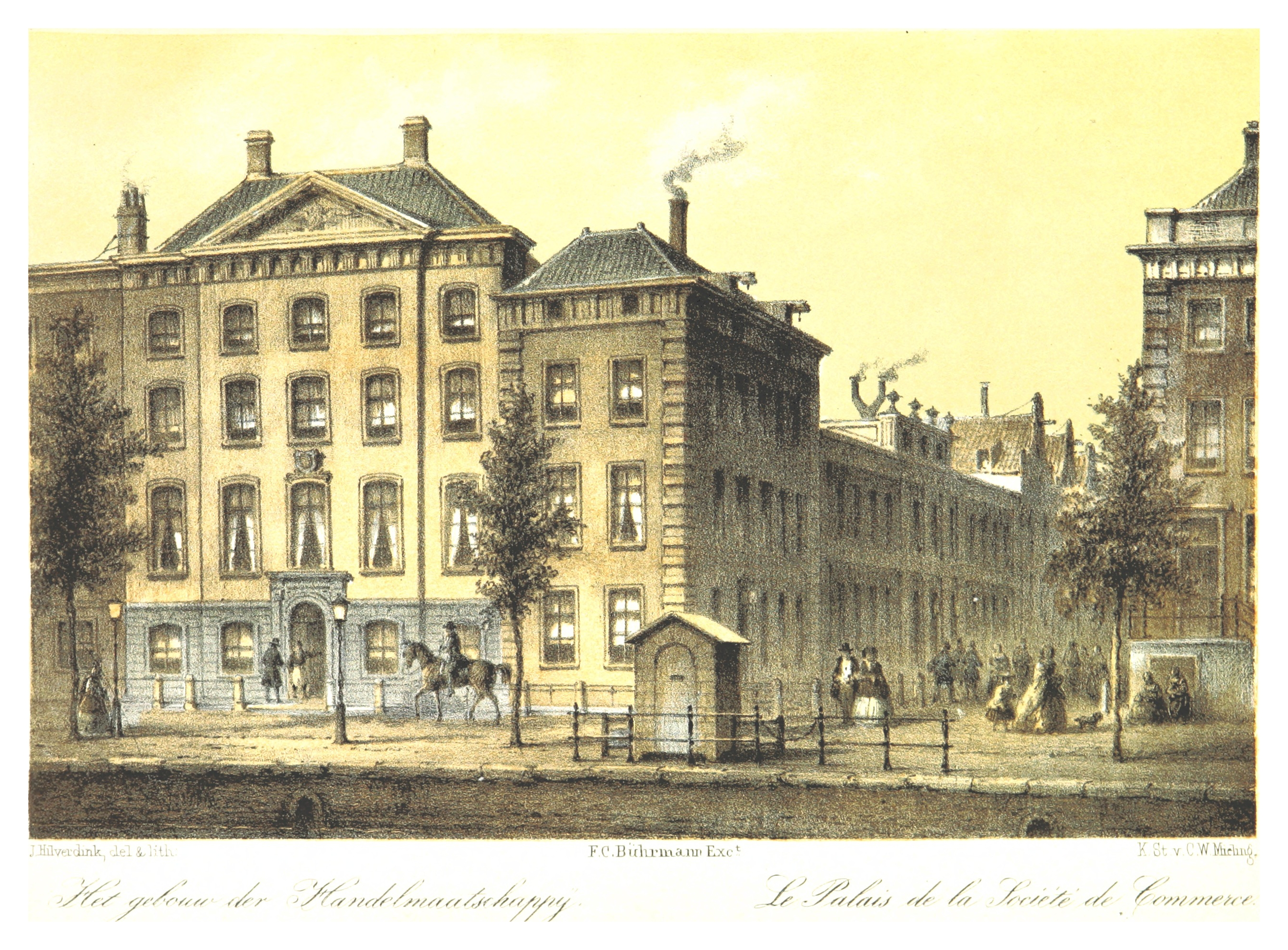
NHM head office building in Amsterdam, 1860, at Heerengracht 466

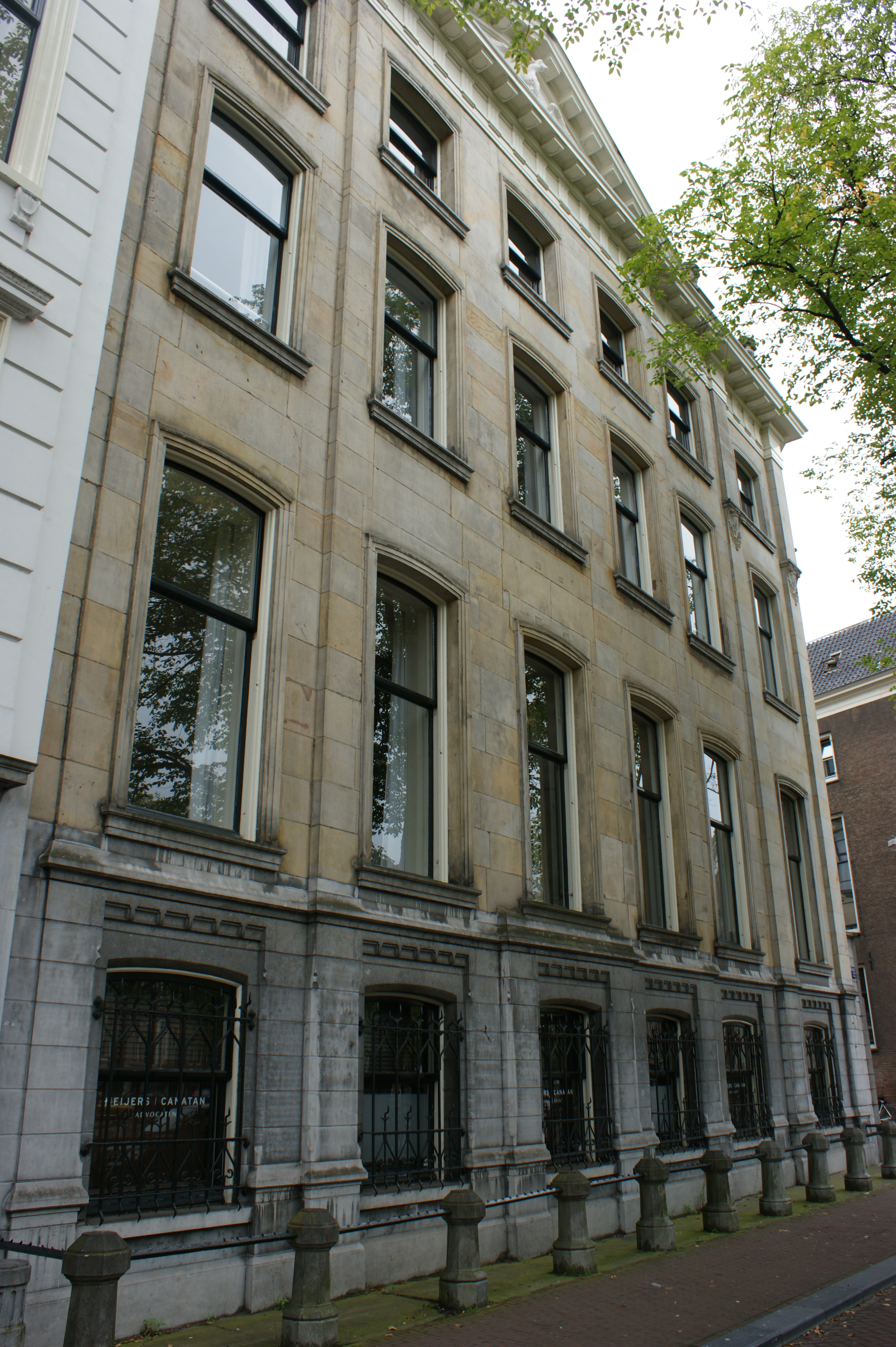
The same building in 2011

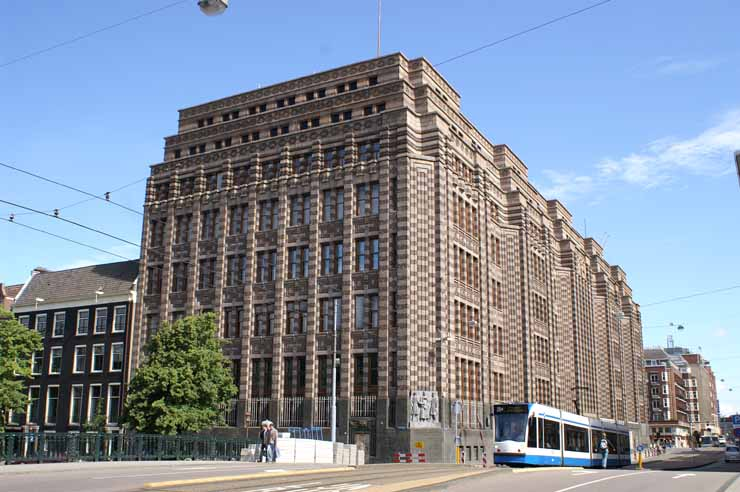
"De Bazel", built in 1919-1926

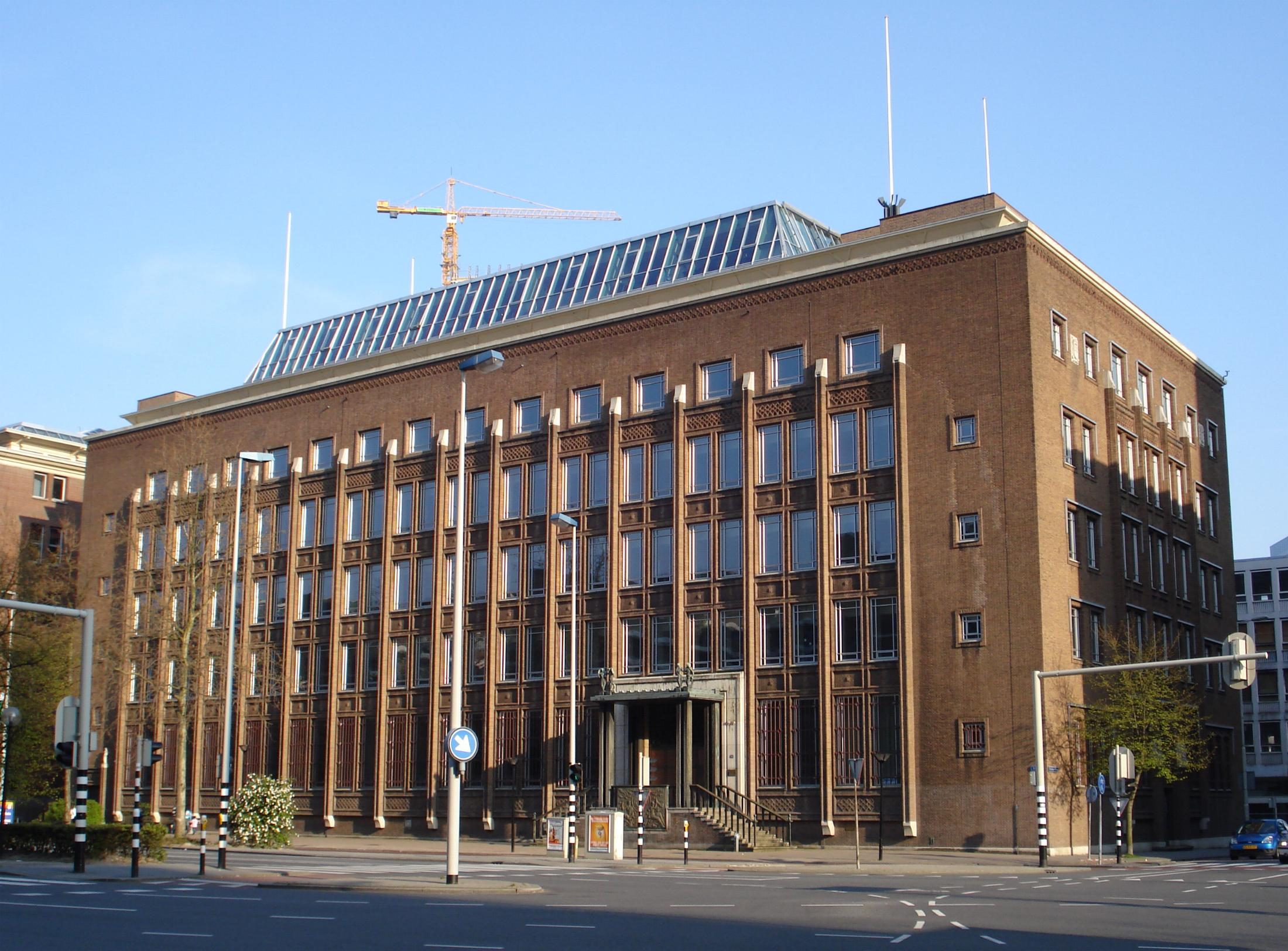
Former NHM branch in Rotterdam, now Blaak House office center

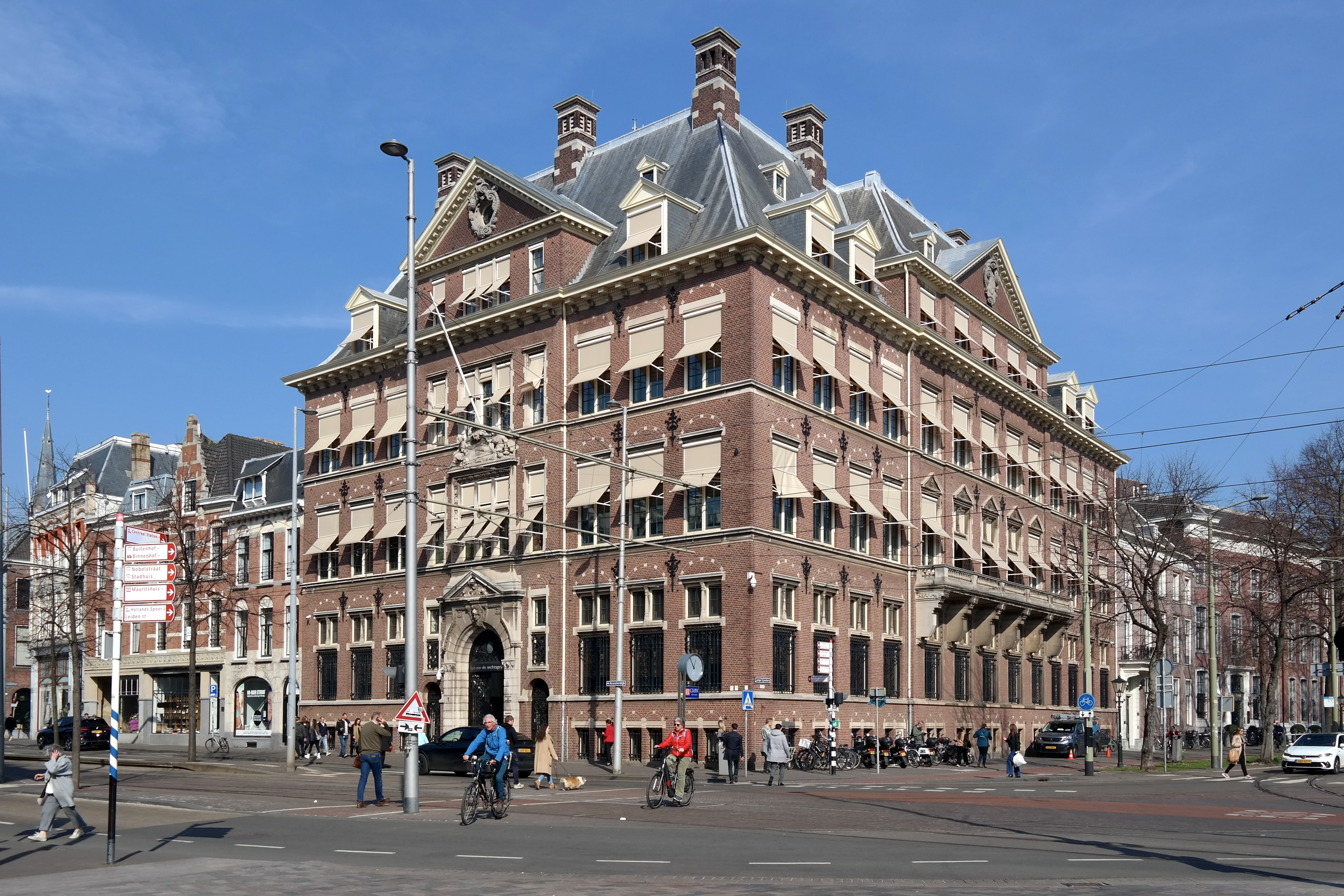
Former NHM branch in The Hague, now Raad van Discipline

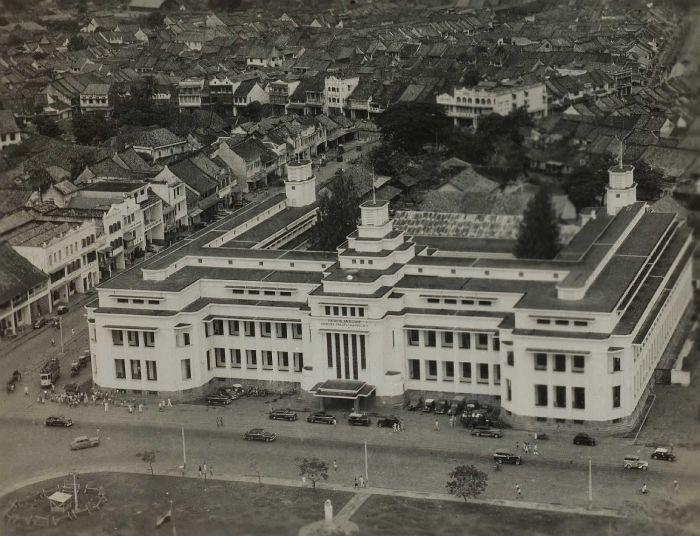
NHM branch in Jakarta, circa 1955

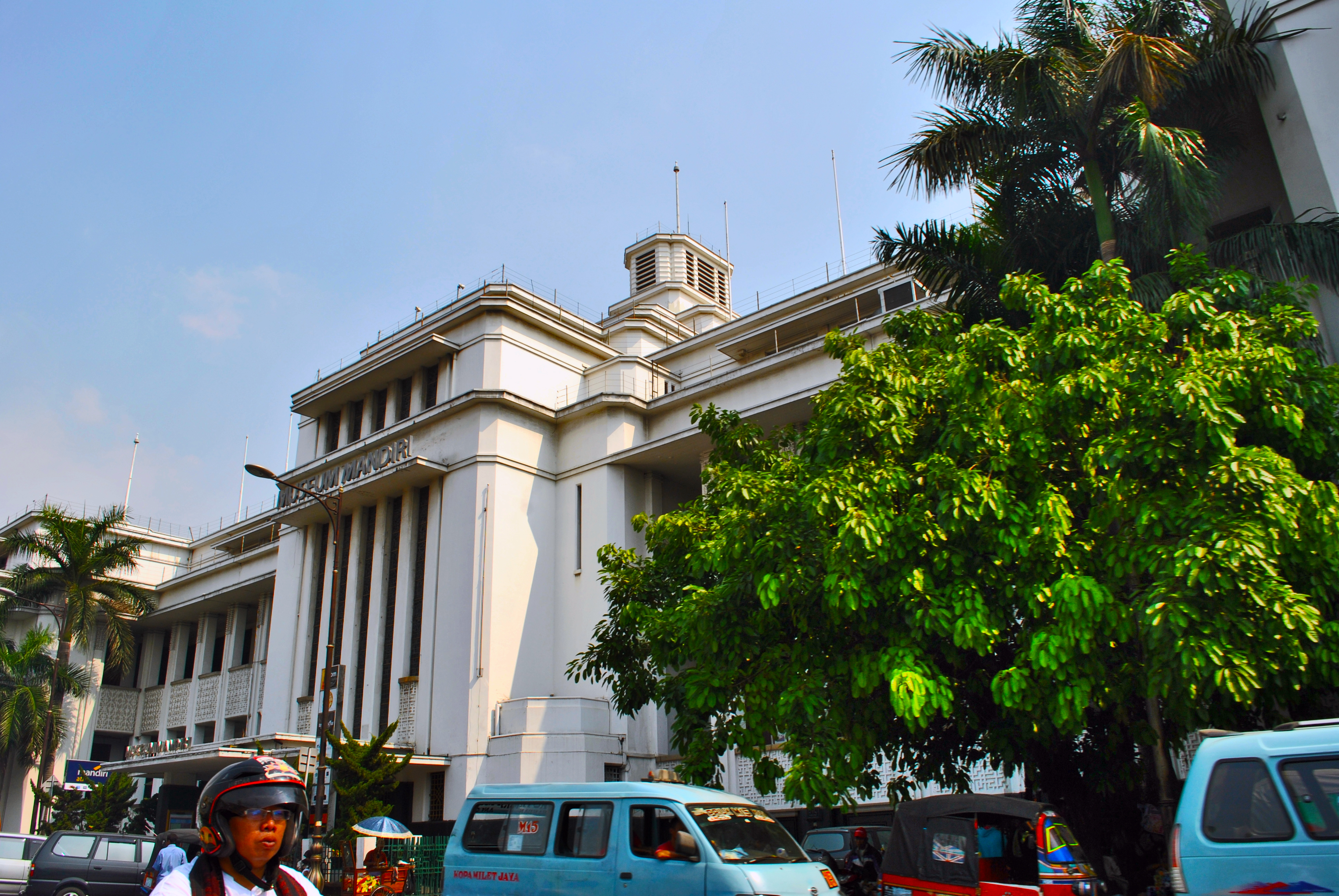
The same building in 2017, as Mandiri Museum

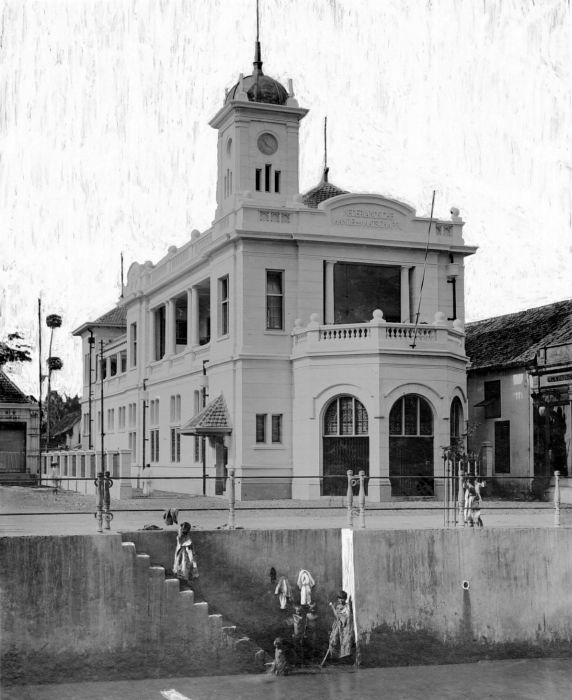
NHM branch in Weltevreden, Batavia (now Sawah Besar, Central Jakarta)

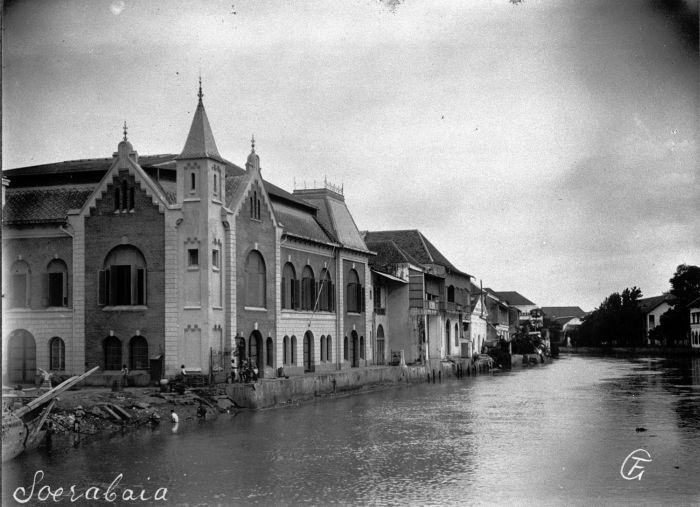
NHM branch in Surabaya, East Java

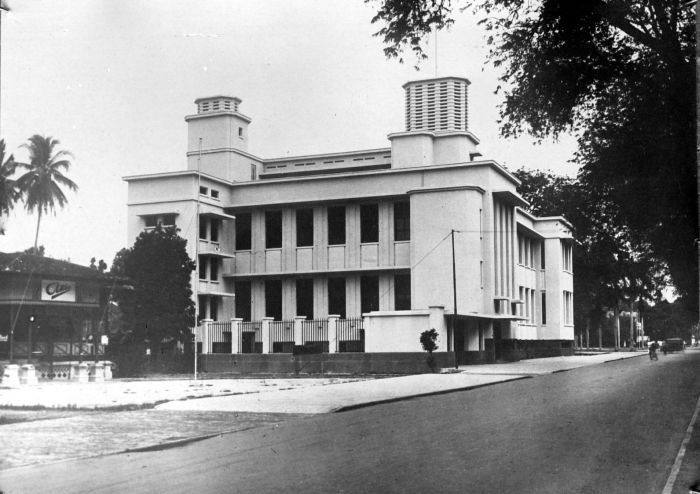
NHM branch in Medan, North Sumatra

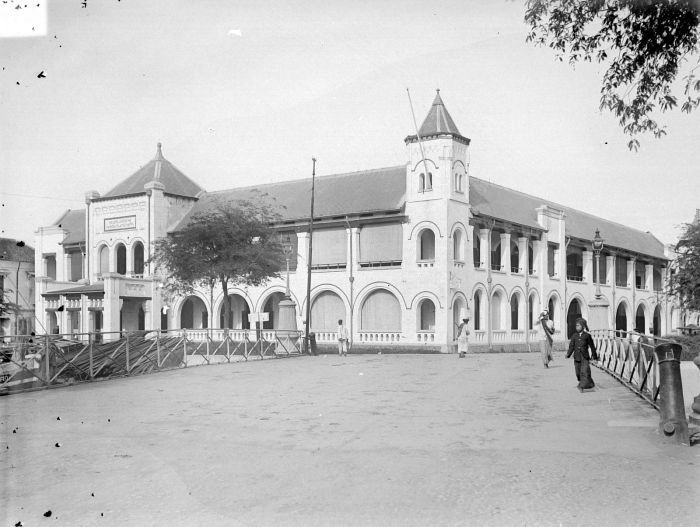
NHM branch in Semarang, Central Java

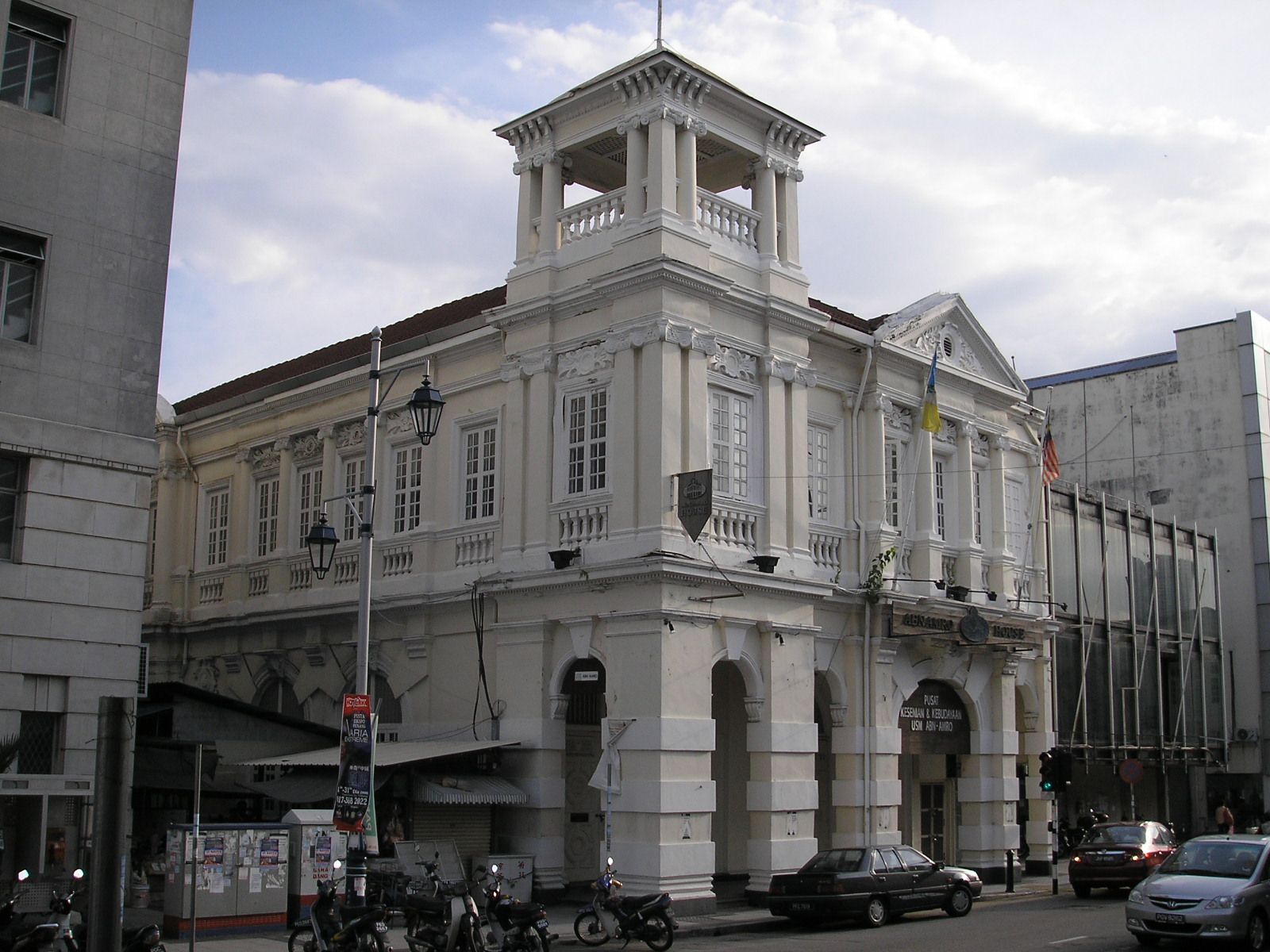
Former NHM branch in Penang, Malaysia

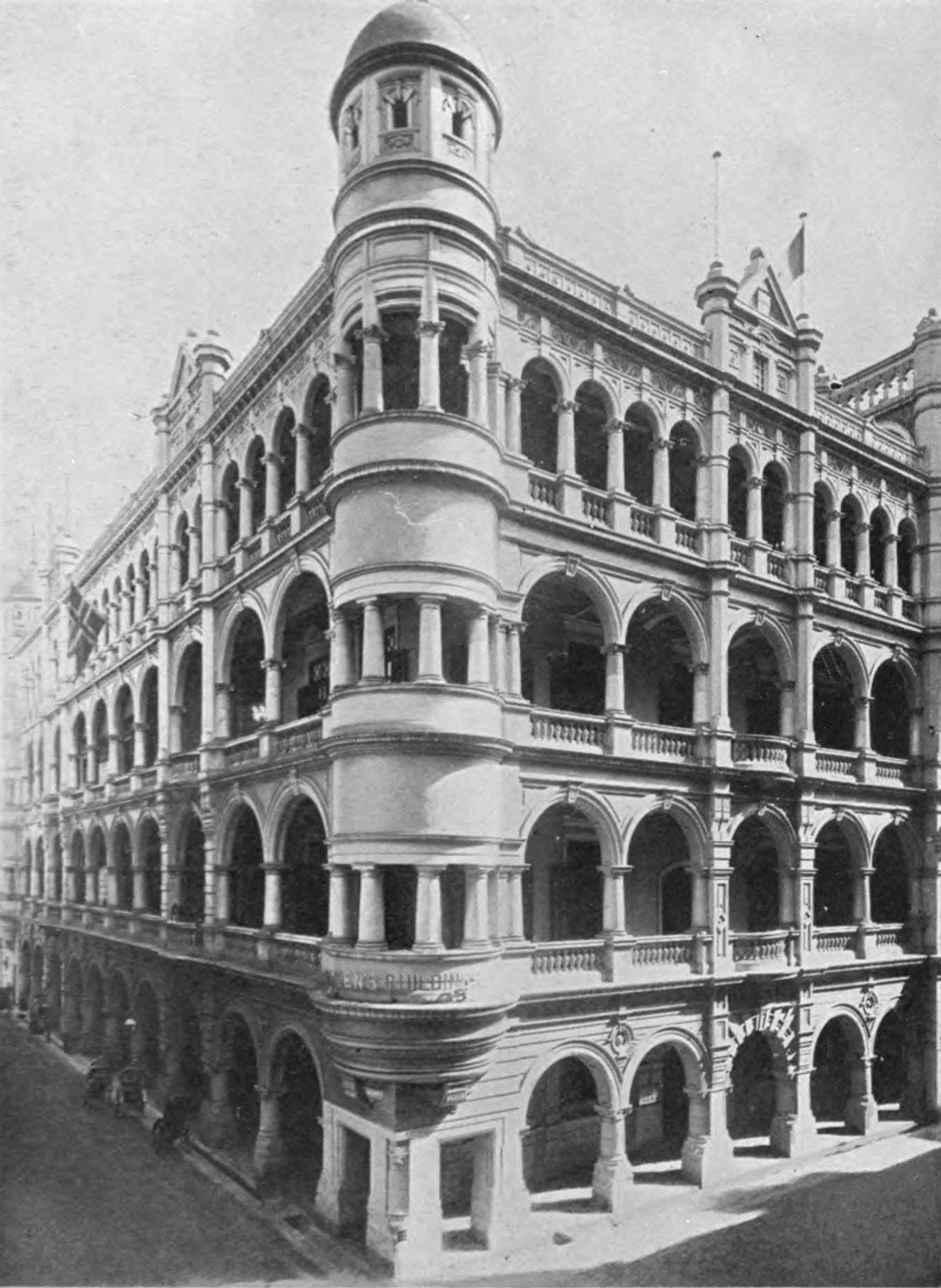
NHM branch in Queen's Building, Hong Kong, 1908

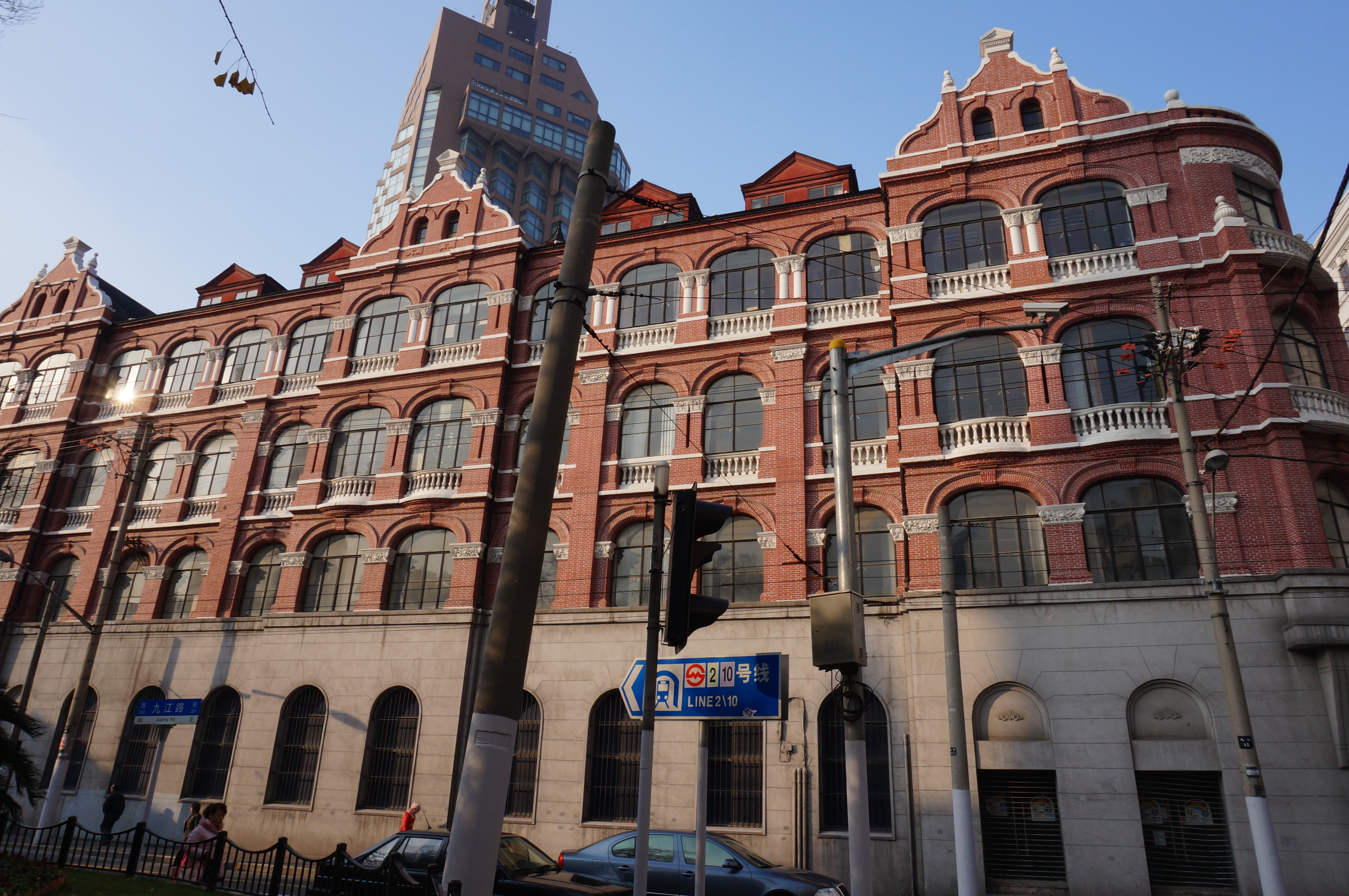
Former NHM branch in Shanghai from 1919 to 1951, previously office of German trading house Carlowitz & Co. expropriated in 1917

== See also ==
- Bank Indonesia, formerly Bank of Java
- Nederlandsch-Indische Handelsbank
- Nederlandsch-Indische Escompto Maatschappij
- Nederlandsch-Indische Levensverzekerings en Lijfrente Maatschappij
- HSBC
- Banque de l'Indochine
- List of banks in the Netherlands
