= Basilica (disambiguation) =

A basilica is a form of large building.

Basilica may also refer to:

- Basilica (moth), a group of moths
- Basilicas in the Catholic Church, an honorific given to certain churches in the Catholic Church
- Basilic vein, a vein in the arm; abbreviated V. basilica
- "Basilica", a 1995 song by Jawbreaker from Dear You

== See also ==
- Basilica Cathedral (disambiguation)
- Basilika, a collection of Byzantine law
- Basil (disambiguation)
- Basilicata, Italy
