= Church of St. Basil of Ostrog =

Church of St. Basil of Ostrog may refer to:

- Church of St. Basil of Ostrog, Belgrade, in Bežanijska Kosa neighbourhood of New Belgrade, Serbia
- Ostrog monastery, a Serbian Orthodox Church monastery in Ostroška Greda, Montenegro
- St. Basil of Ostrog Monastery, a monastery of the Serbian Orthodox Churchin Crnogorci near the town of Imotski in Dalmatia, Croatia
- Church of St. Basil of Ostrog, Blagaj, Bosnia and Herzegovina
