= St. Basil's Church =

St. Basil's Church may refer to:

Canada

- St. Basil's Church (Toronto), on the campus of the University of Toronto

Malta

- Chapel of St Basil, Mqabba

Russia

- Saint Basil's Cathedral, on Red Square in Moscow

Turkey

- St. Basil's Church, Tirilye

United Kingdom

- St Basil's Church, Deritend, Birmingham
- Church of St Basil and St Paisios, Lincoln

United States

- St. Basil Catholic Church, Los Angeles, California
- Chapel of St. Basil, on the campus of the University of St. Thomas in Houston, Texas

== See also ==
- Church of St. Basil of Ostrog (disambiguation)
- Basil of Caesarea
