= Bezel (disambiguation) =

A bezel is the rim which encompasses and fastens a jewel, watch crystal, lens or other object.

Bezel may also refer to:

== People ==
- Jay Bezel (born 1983), American rapper
- Vladimir Bezel (fl. 1918), Russian politician

== Other uses ==
- Bezel, the sloping facets of the crown of a cut gem after gem cutting
- Screen bezel, a space or frame around a display device, such as on a television or mobile device
- Bezel, the removable plastic faceplate or front panel of a slot, such as on an optical disc drive
- Bezel, a character in the American animated web series Chikn Nuggit

== See also ==
- Bazel (disambiguation)
