= Saint Basil (disambiguation) =

Saint Basil may refer to:

== People ==
- Basil the Elder, 4th-century saint, father of Basil the Great
- Basil of Caesarea, also known as Basil the Great, 4th-century bishop and Church Father
- Basil of Ancyra (hieromartyr), 4th-century hieromartyr
- Basil of Ancyra (martyr), 4th-century martyr
- Basil the Confessor, 8th-century saint
- Basil the Younger, 10th-century Constantinopolitan ascetic and visionary
- Basil Fool for Christ, Russian saint
- Basil of Ostrog, Serbian saint

== Places ==
- Saint-Basile Parish, New Brunswick, New Brunswick, formerly named St. Basil Parish
- St. Basile 10, an Indian reserve surrounded by Edmundston
- Saint-Basile, Quebec, Canada
- Saint-Basile, Ardèche, France
- Saint-Basile-le-Grand, Quebec, Canada
- Saint Basil Academy (Garrison, New York)
- Saint Basil Academy (Jenkintown, Pennsylvania)
- Saint Basil's Cathedral, Moscow, Russia

== See also ==
- St. Basil's Church (disambiguation)
