= Bazel (disambiguation) =

Bazel is a village in Belgium.

Bazel may also refer to:

- Bazel (software), an open source build tool initially created by Google

== See also ==
- De Bazel
- Bezel (disambiguation)
- Basel (disambiguation)
