= Martin Monnickendam =

Dutch painter and draftsman

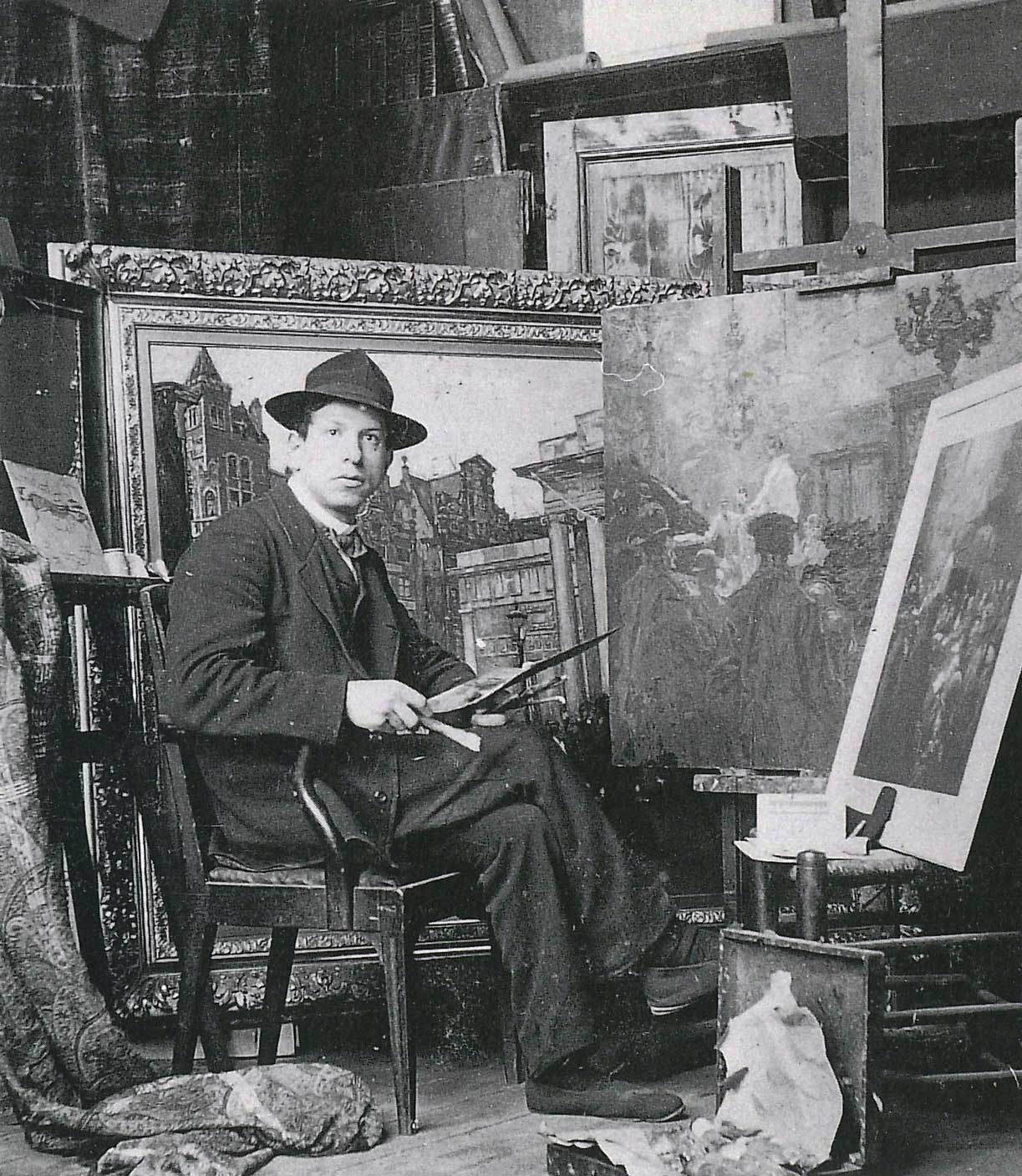
- Born: 25 February 1874; Amsterdam
- Died: 4 January 1943 (aged 68); Amsterdam, German-occupied Netherlands

Martin Monnickendam (25 February 1874 – 4 January 1943) was a Dutch painter and draftsman.

== Life ==
Monnickendam was born in Amsterdam, to Nathan Meyer Monnickendam and Roosje Rippe. He was trained at the Rijksakademie van beeldende kunsten there from 1891. His early work is mostly animal drawings made at Natura Artis Magistra. He continued his studies in Paris at the École des Arts et Métiers from 1895. He won various awards and took study trips to London and Italy. Today, his work is seen as being in the school of George Breitner. He married Alice Mouzin on the 9th August 1906 in Amsterdam.

He became a member of Arti et Amicitiae in 1904 and a member of the Vereeniging Sint Lucas in 1905. He became a teacher in Amsterdam at the international painting academy there. In 1924 on the occasion of his 50th birthday an honorary show was held for him at the Stedelijk Museum and in 1934 he was named officer in the Order of Orange-Nassau.

His work was part of the art competitions at the 1924 Summer Olympics and the 1928 Summer Olympics. He also won a medal at the Paris World Exposition in 1937.

Monnickendam died in Amsterdam in 1943 in straitened circumstances while waiting to be deported as a Jew. In 2009 a show of his works was held in Amsterdam city archives.

== Works ==
His works are held by Joods Historisch Museum, Rijksmuseum, the Stadsarchief Amsterdam, the Gemeentemuseum Den Haag and the Amsterdam Museum.

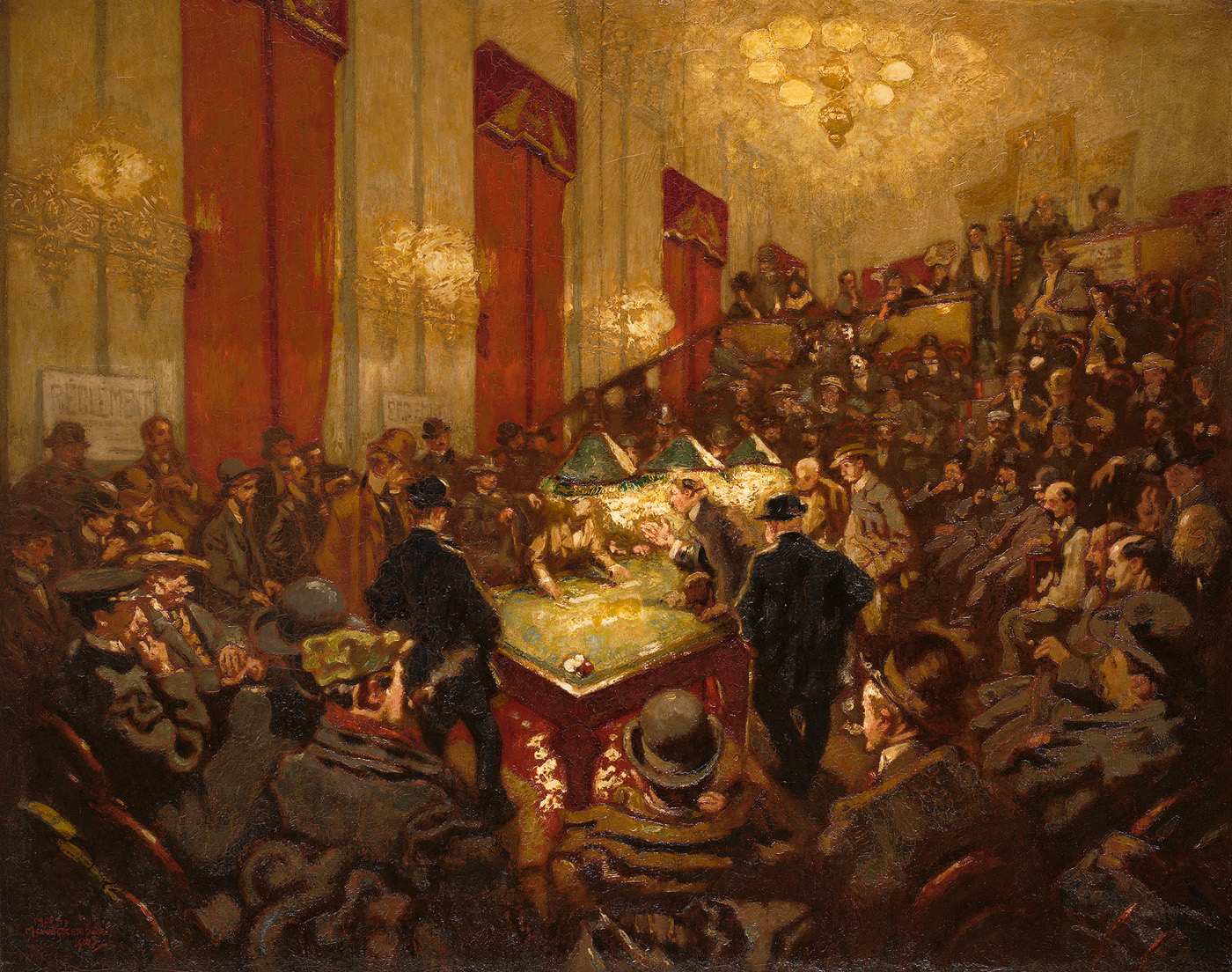
Académie de Billard, 1907

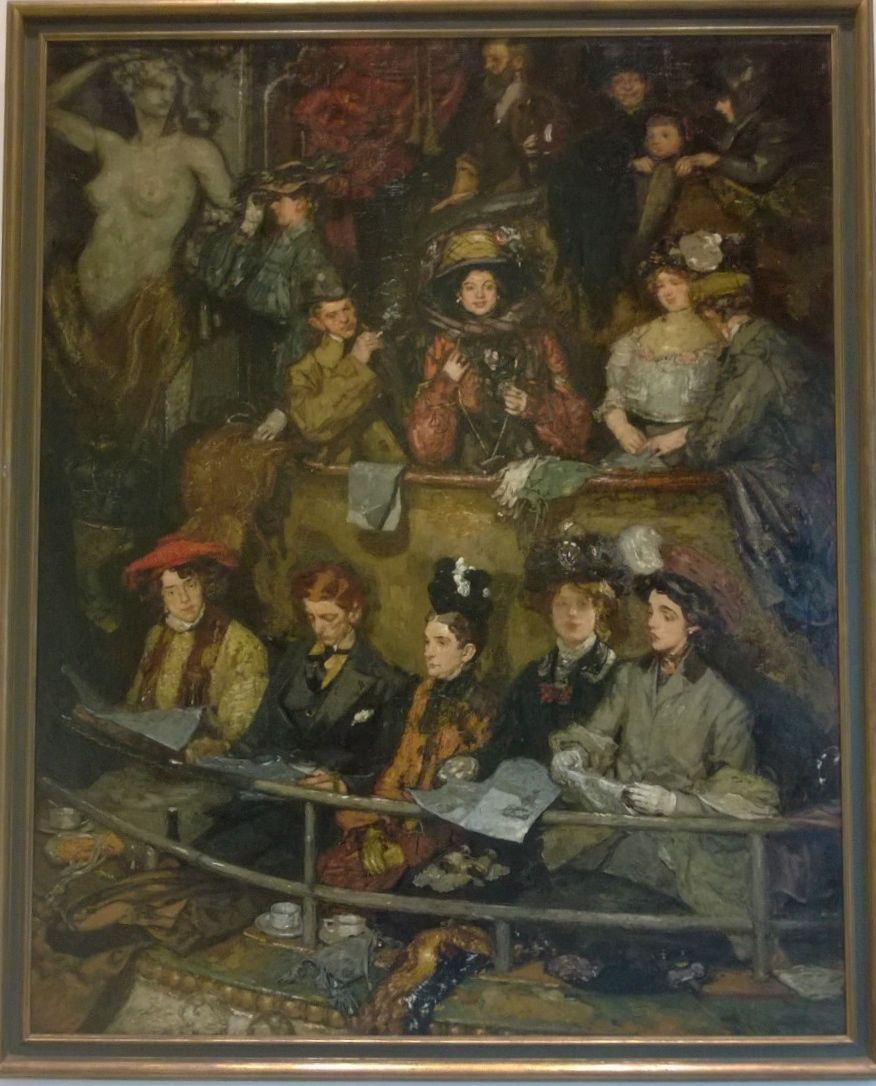
Intermission, 1912

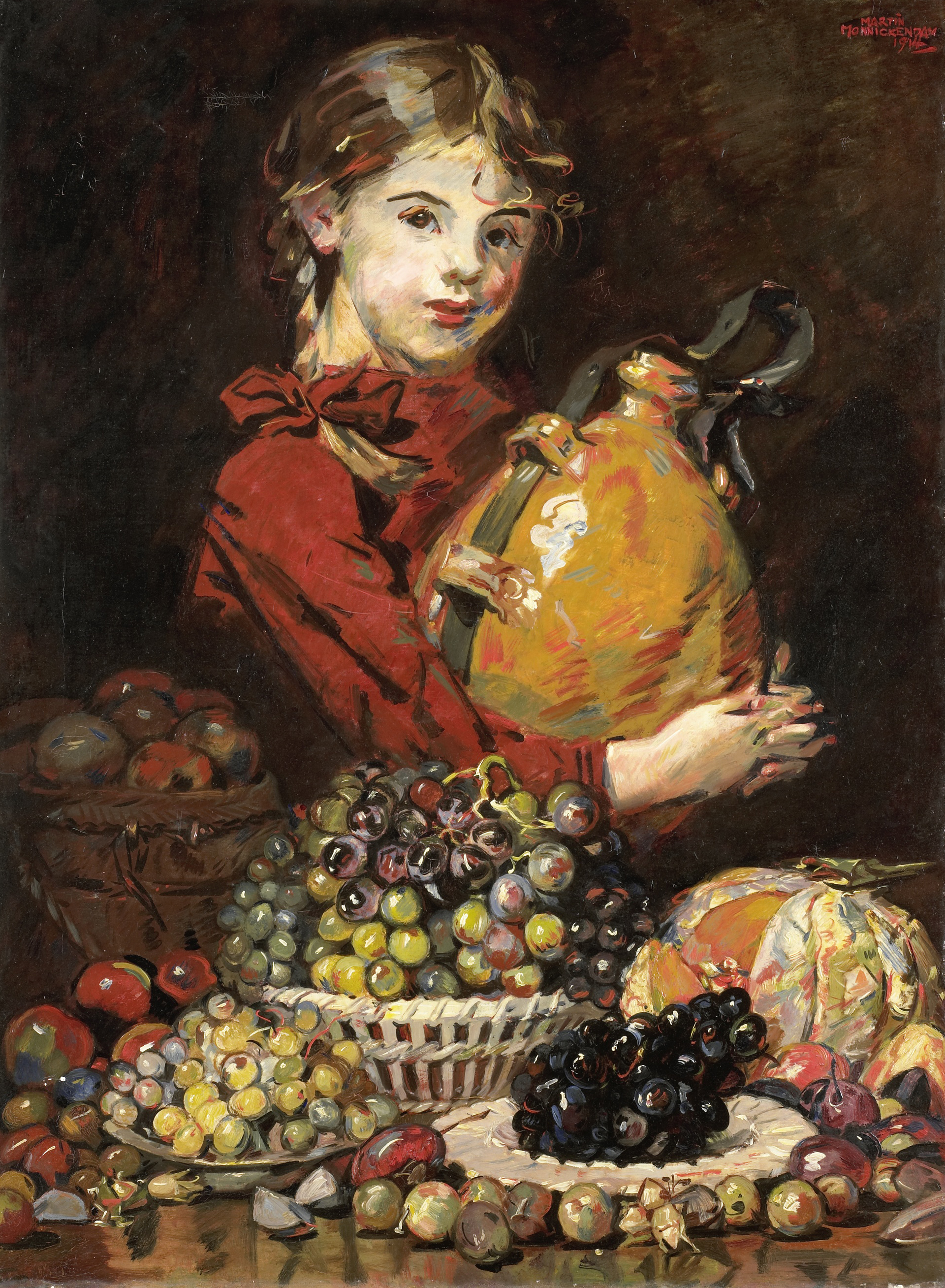
Monarosa, his daughter, 1914

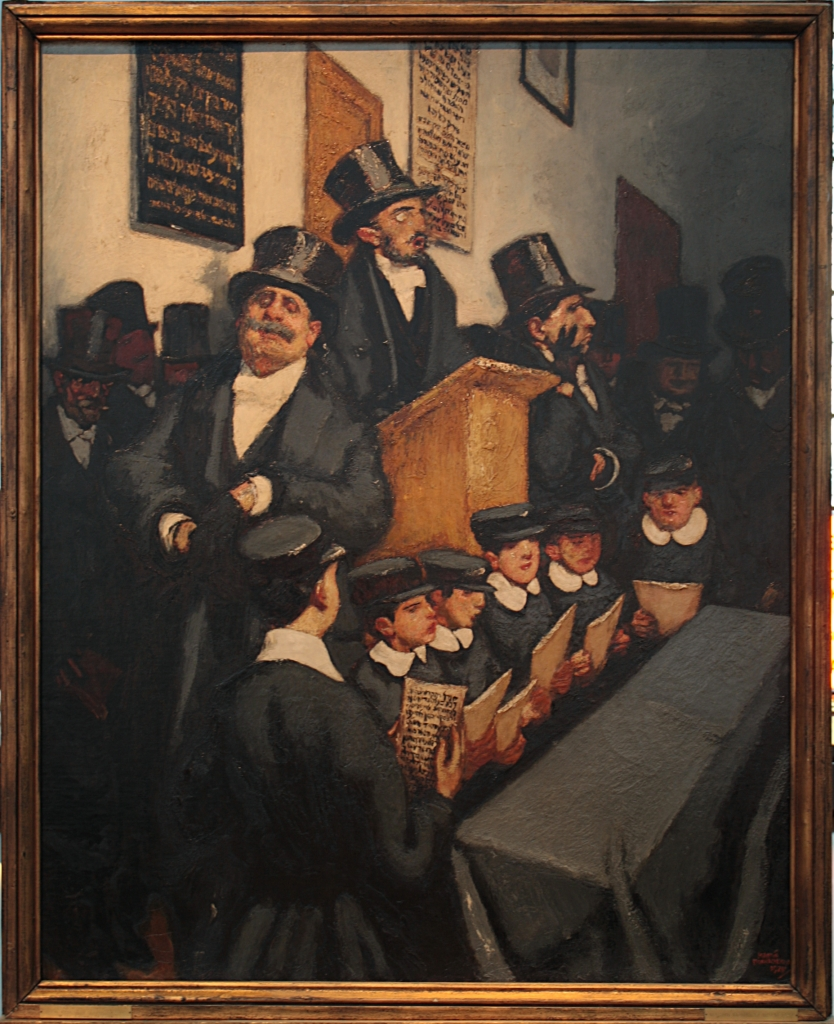
The Orphans, 1924

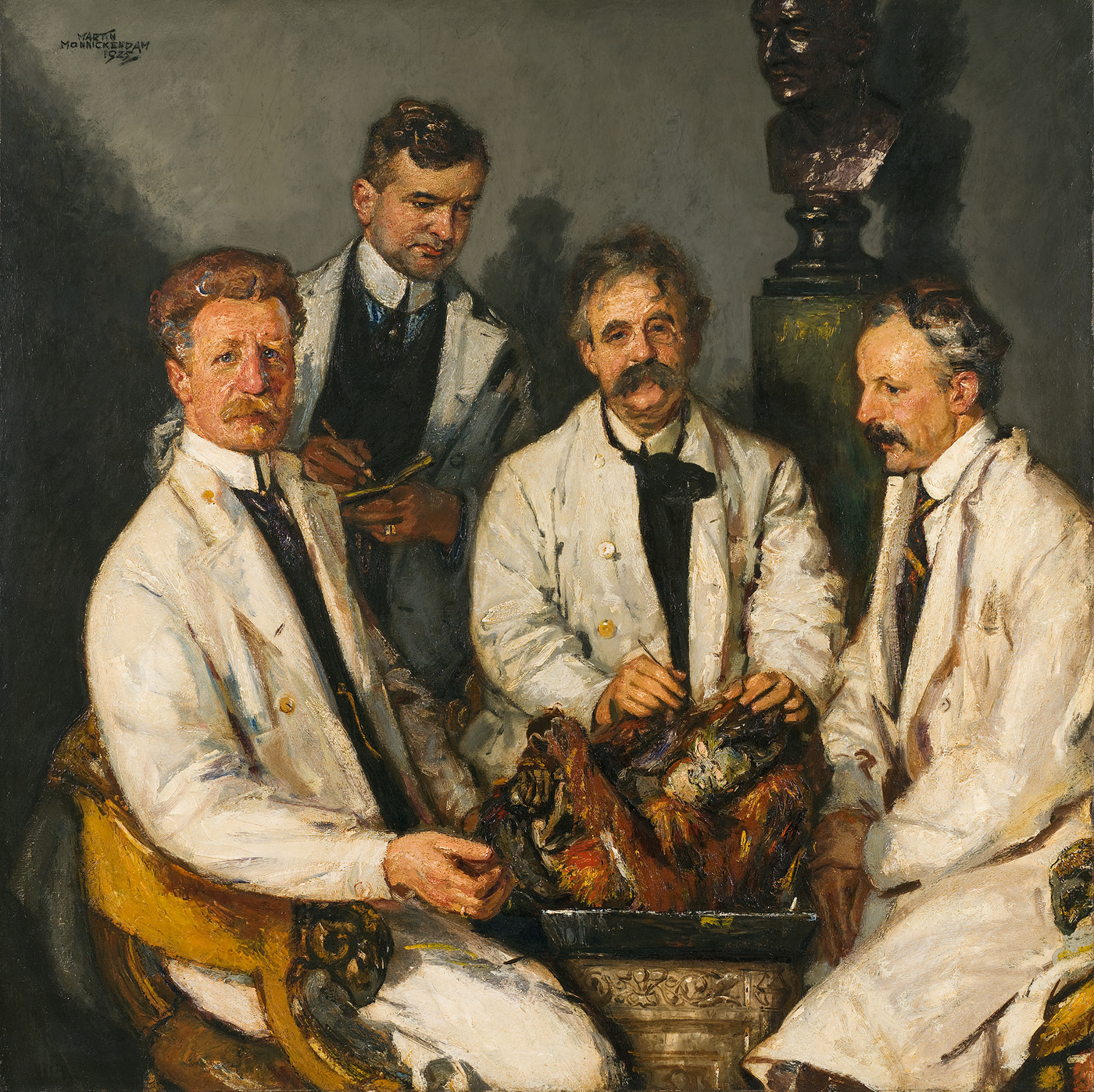
Anatomy lesson of Prof. L. Bolk, 1925

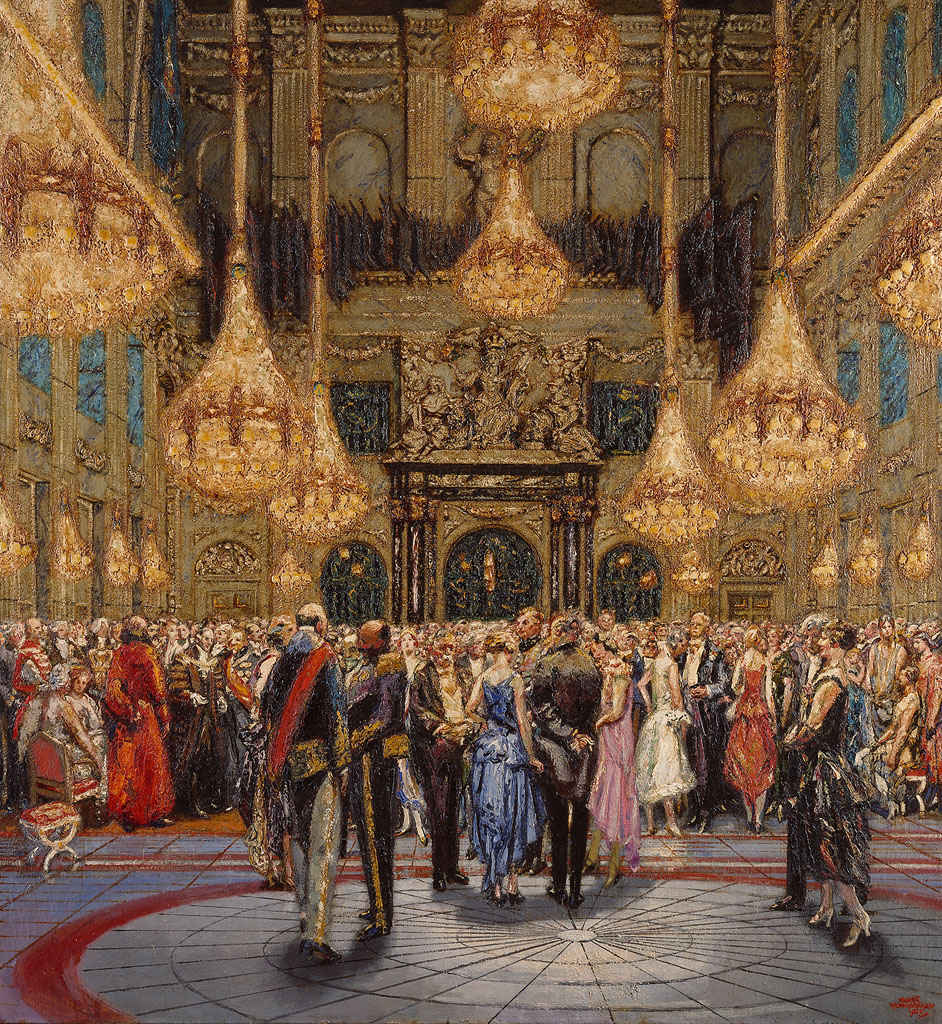
The reception of the Lord Mayor in the Burgerzaal of the Royal Palace on the Dam, 1929
