= Church of St. Basil of Ostrog, Belgrade =

Church in Belgrade, Serbia

Coordinates: 44°49′13″N 20°23′17″E

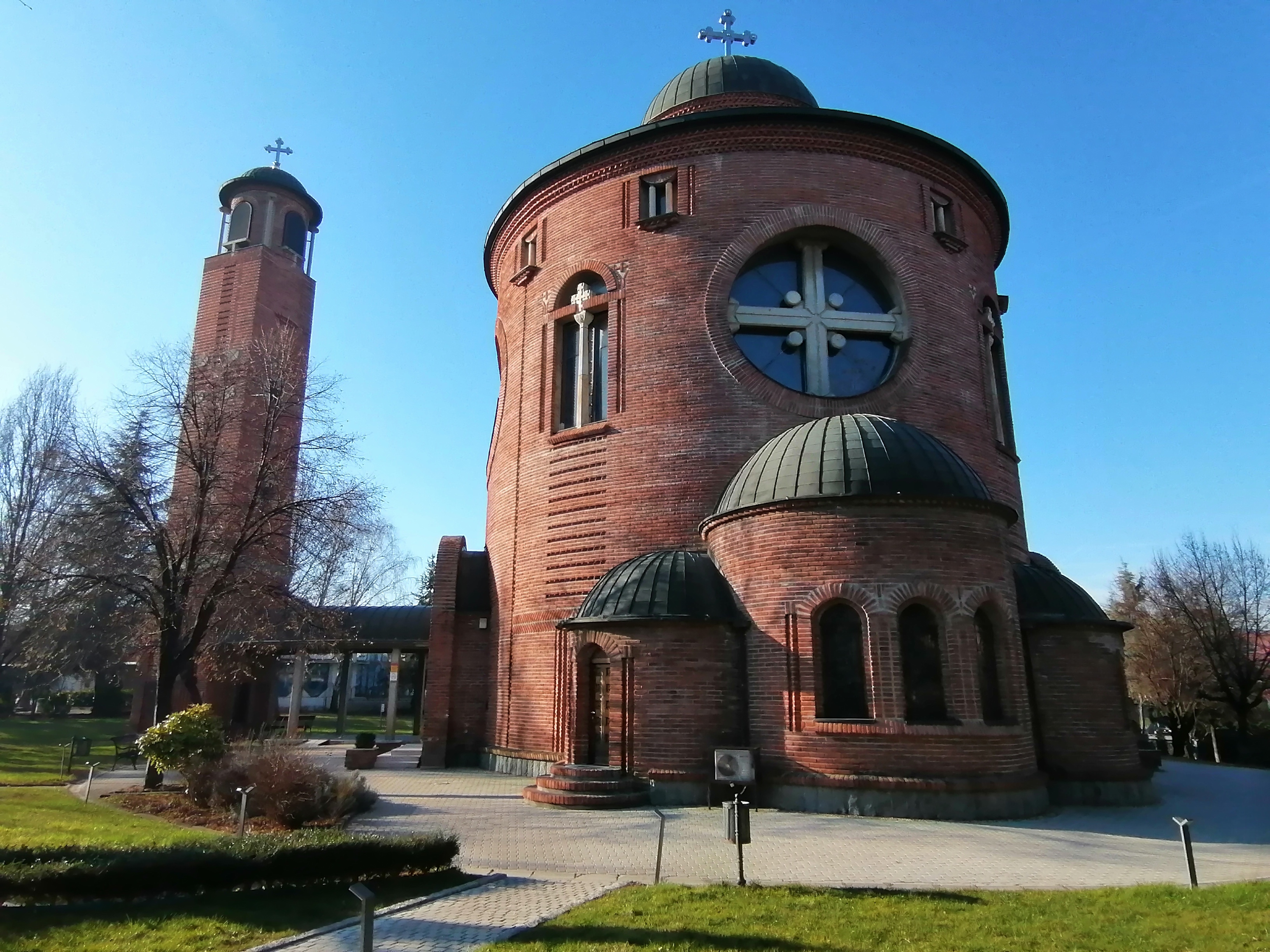
Church of St Basil of Ostrog, Bežanijska Kosa, New Belgrade

Church of Saint Basil of Ostrog (Serbian: Црква Светог Василија Острошког, romanized: Crkva Svetog Vasilija Ostroškog) is a Serbian Orthodox Church located in Bežanijska Kosa neighbourhood of New Belgrade. Its construction started in 1996 and completed in 2001, and is the first church built in New Belgrade since World War II. The architect Mihajlo Mitrović adopted an "old Christian" rotunda-plan combined with side galleries and a tall bell-tower to the west. Funding for the project was provided by civilians, whom the saint is known to as the Miracle maker.
