= Richard von Carlowitz =

German merchant

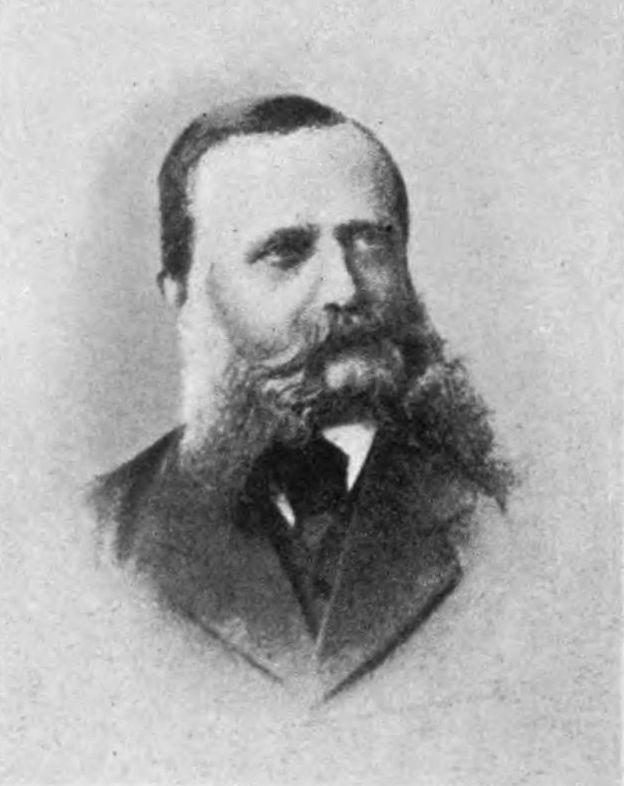
Richard von Carlowitz

Richard von Carlowitz (1817-1886) was a German merchant active in Canton in the 1840s. He was consul for Prussia & Saxony from 1847 to 1869, and for the North German Federation from 1869.
