= De Bazel =

Historic building and archives in Amsterdam

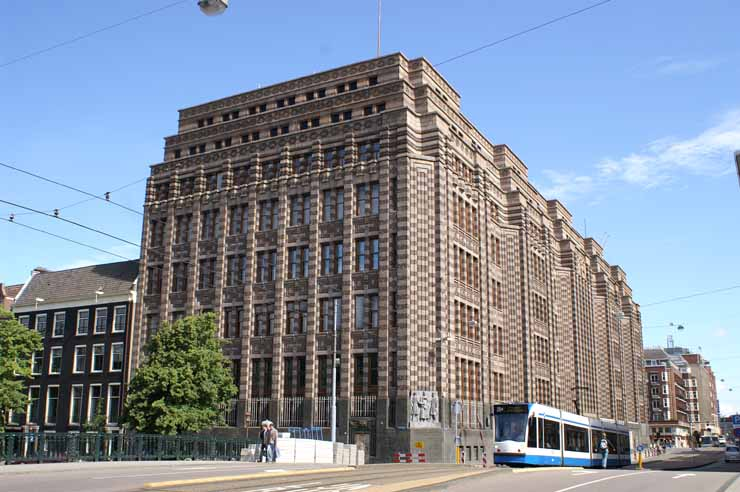
- The De Bazel building.
- Interactive map of the De Bazel area

General information
- Architectural style: Brick Expressionism
- Location: Vijzelstraat 32, Amsterdam, Netherlands
- Coordinates: 52.3653°N 4.8914°E
- Year built: 1919–1926
- Construction started: 1919
- Completed: 1926
- Opened: 1926
- Renovated: 2005–2007
- Owner: City of Amsterdam

Technical details
- Material: Concrete frame, brick, granite, syenite

Design and construction
- Architect: Karel de Bazel

Website
- stadsarchief.amsterdam.nl

De Bazel is a listed/protected historic building on the west side of the Vijzelstraat in Amsterdam (at number 32), and stretches from the Herengracht to the Keizersgracht. It stands as an example of Brick Expressionism.

== History ==
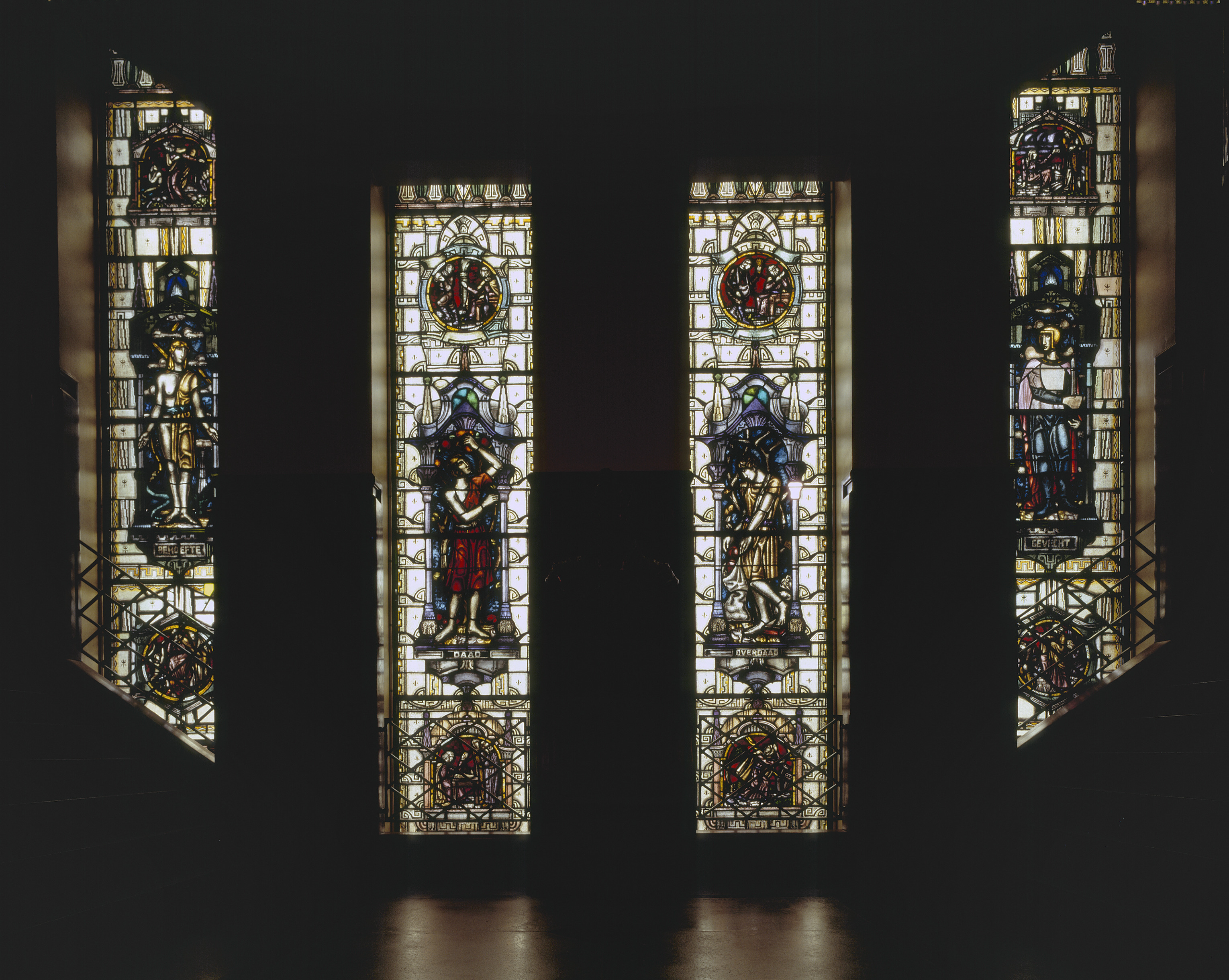
Stained glass windows

The building was the most important work of the Dutch architect Karel de Bazel and was built from 1919 to 1926 as the head office of the Nederlandsche Handel-Maatschappij (NHM). The architect died in 1923, three years before completion. Construction was continued by his chef de bureau C. van de Linde, together with designer Adolf Leonard van Gendt. Sculptures on the outside of the building are by Joseph Mendes da Costa, Lambertus Zijl and Hendrik A. van den Eijnde. The stained glass windows were made by Joep Nicolas after designs by Antoon Derkinderen. The building was titled De Spekkoek, after the Dutch-Indonesian delicacy spekkoek, but is now named after the architect.

=== Colonial History ===
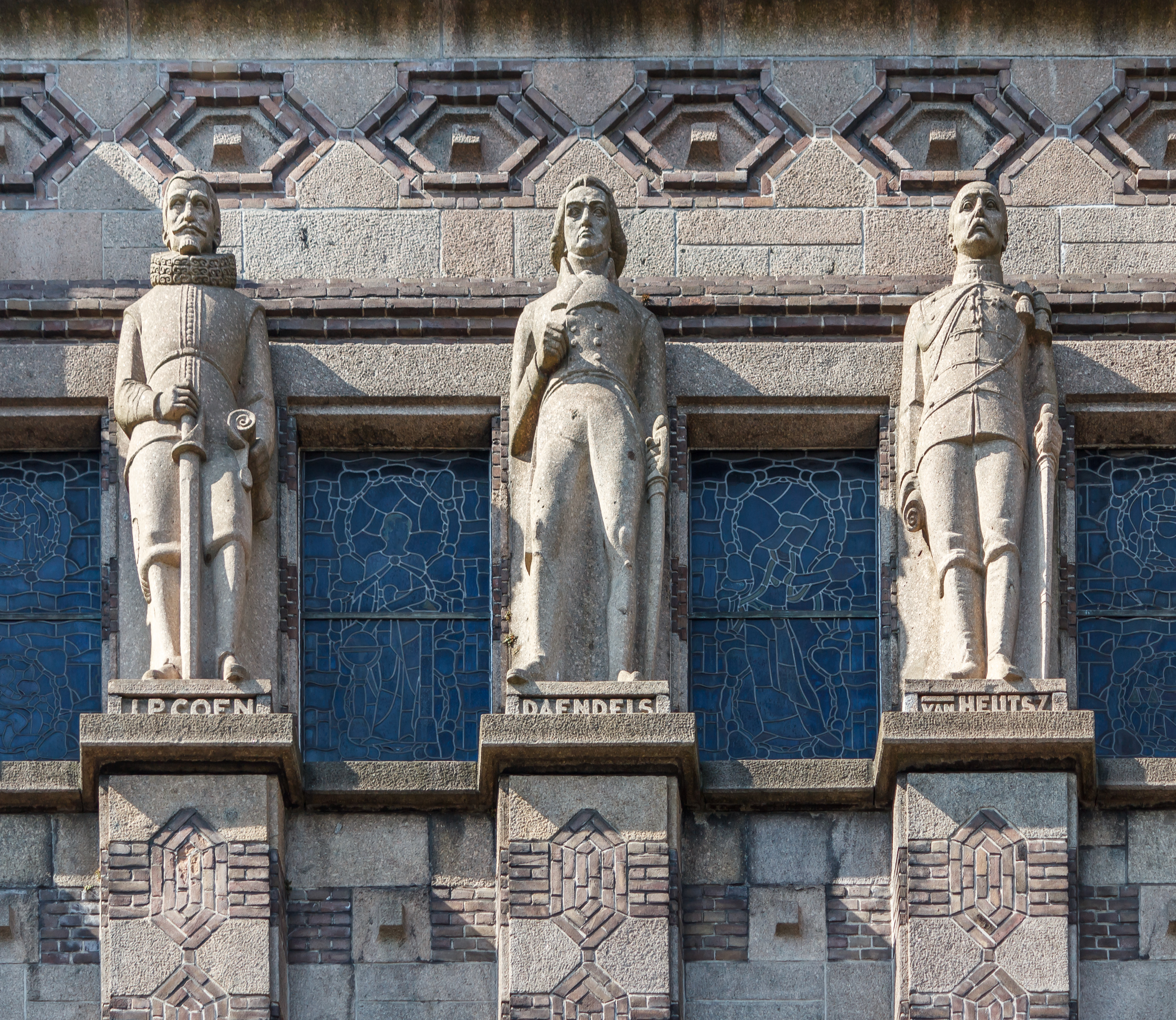
Three colonial generals crowning the top of the building

The building commemorates the history of the NHM and specifically the heroic deeds of the three colonial generals J. P. Coen, Daendels, and J. B. van Heutsz.

De Bazel served as main office of the NHM, then the Algemene Bank Nederland and the Dutch bank ABN AMRO. In 1999 the city of Amsterdam bought the building. After renovation, the building re-opened on 7 August 2007 to house the Amsterdam City Archives (Stadsarchief Amsterdam). It is open to the public. The building also houses the Bureau Monumenten & Archeologie (bMA). It was officially opened on 12 September 2007 by Queen Beatrix.

== The building ==
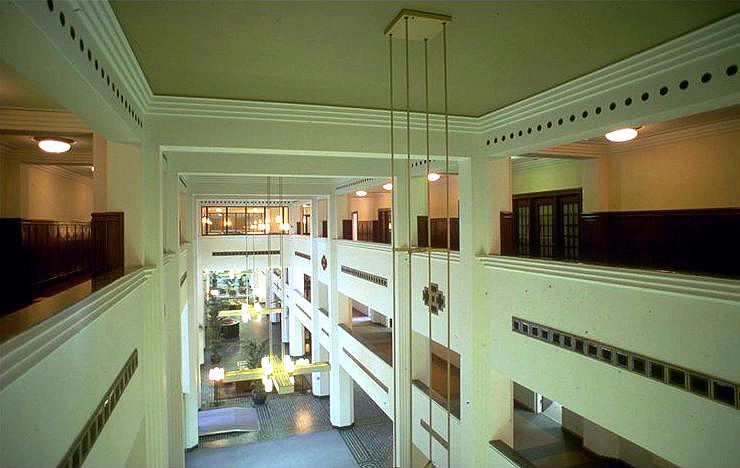
Interior today

The building has a concrete framing (designed by A.D.N. van Gendt) covered by interchanged layers of brick and granite, which gave rise to its nickname De Spekkoek ("Layer Cake"). In the base, syenite was used. To visually temper these horizontal elements, vertical elements were added to the building's facade. The building is centered on two light-courts, and its inner details bear some resemblance to works of American architects Frank Lloyd Wright and Louis Sullivan. Almost all interior parts of the building, such as floor mosaics, frames of the airducts, telephone booths, room decorations, as well as its furniture, were also designed by de Bazel.

The materials, massing, scale, interior details and exterior sculptures all mark this building as a good, although late, example of the Dutch variety of Brick Expressionism. Though many changes were made to the building much of the interior has remained in its original state, among which the large meeting room on the third floor. The building was declared a monument in 1991.
