= St. Basil of Ostrog Monastery =

Serbian Orthodox monastery

Coordinates: 43.7364°N 15.8931°E

The St. Basil of Ostrog Monastery (Serbian: Манастир Светог Василија Острошког, romanized: Manastir Svetog Vasilija Ostroškog) is a Serbian Orthodox monastery dedicated to Saint Basil of Ostrog located in the village of Crnogorci near the town of Imotski in Dalmatia, Croatia. The construction of the monastery began in 2005, and it had been suspended in 2006 after protests from the municipality of Podbablje.

== See also ==
- List of Serbian Orthodox monasteries
- Serbs of Croatia
