= Amsterdam City Archives =

- Stadsarchief Amsterdam
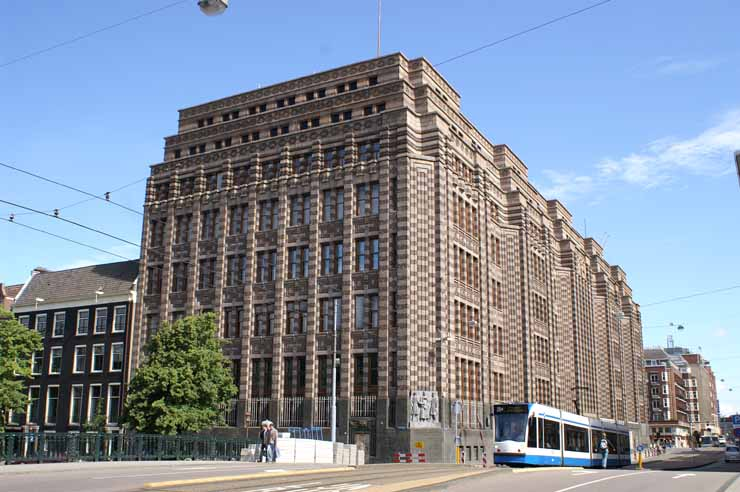
- De Bazel, home of the Amsterdam City Archives

- Location within the city center of Amsterdam.
- Location: Vijzelstraat 32, Amsterdam, Netherlands
- Coordinates: 52.3646°N 4.8923°E
- Type: archive
- Visitors: 130,154 (2014)
- Website: www.amsterdam.nl/stadsarchief/ (in Dutch)

The Amsterdam City Archives (Dutch: Stadsarchief Amsterdam) preserves documents pertaining to the history of Amsterdam and provides information about the city. With archives covering a shelf-length of about 50 kilometres, the Amsterdam City Archives is the largest municipal archive in the world.

== History ==
In the Middle Ages, Amsterdam’s important documents were stored in a special cabinet that was kept in the so-called ‘Iron Chapel’ (IJzeren Kapel) in the Old Church (Oude Kerk). In the nineteenth century, the archives moved to the Waag building at the Nieuwmarkt, and in 1914 to the former town hall of Nieuwer-Amstel. Since the summer of 2007, the Amsterdam City Archives have been located in the monumental building De Bazel, in the city-centre, which derives its name from the famous Dutch architect Karel de Bazel, who designed it.

== Preservation ==
The Amsterdam City Archives belongs to the government of Amsterdam. It preserves the archives of the municipal government and of the national government when related to Amsterdam, besides those of private institutions, families or individuals, and companies connected with the city. The municipalities of Ouder-Amstel and Amstelveen have also deposited their historical archives at the Amsterdam City Archives. In addition, the City Archives houses a large collection of images and audio-visual material, as well as a library.

Among the various documents of international significance kept at the Amsterdam City Archives are the archives of the Heineken brewery and the renowned Concertgebouw, letters written by Charles Darwin and Mahatma Gandhi, an eighteenth-century trade agreement between the city and the newly founded United States of America, the book containing the excommunication of seventeenth-century philosopher Spinoza, and a police report about the theft of Anne Frank’s bike, dated April 13, 1942.

The Amsterdam City Archives also monitors the way the various departments within Amsterdam’s administrative structure manage their archives, ensuring that documents that are of significance for the city’s history are maintained.

== Publication ==
Archival material is made available for consultation both on site and through the internet. In recent years, many documents have been digitized. The website of the Amsterdam City Archives features an Image Bank, containing more than 260.000 photos, drawings, and prints related to the city, and an Archives Database, providing scans of archival material on request, including a wealth of sources for genealogical research, accessible through several indexes. These scans now number more than seven million.

== Exhibitions and events ==
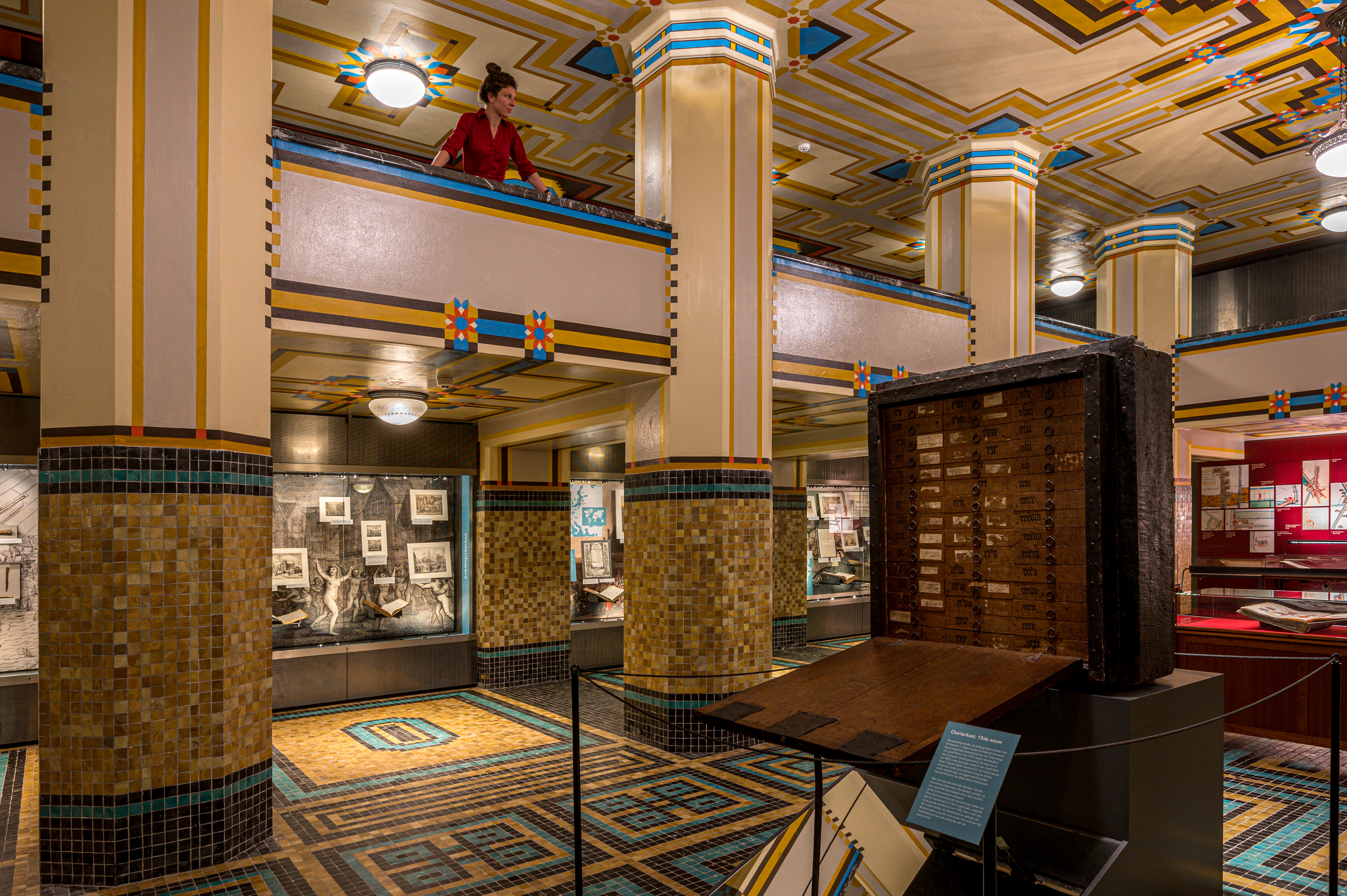
Amsterdam Treasure Room

The Amsterdam City Archives also shares the available expertise on Amsterdam and its history through publications and events. The Archives regularly presents temporary exhibitions, while noteworthy documents are on permanent display in the so-called: Amsterdam Treasure Room. Wander through the Treasure Room, dating from 1926. Find out about Rembrandt or Johan Cruyff and their times. Marvel at the medieval charter cabinet. And follow the change from a small city in a medieval world to a world city in our times. Historical films about Amsterdam are shown in a small movie theatre.

Admission is free.
