= Hugh McColl =

American bank executive

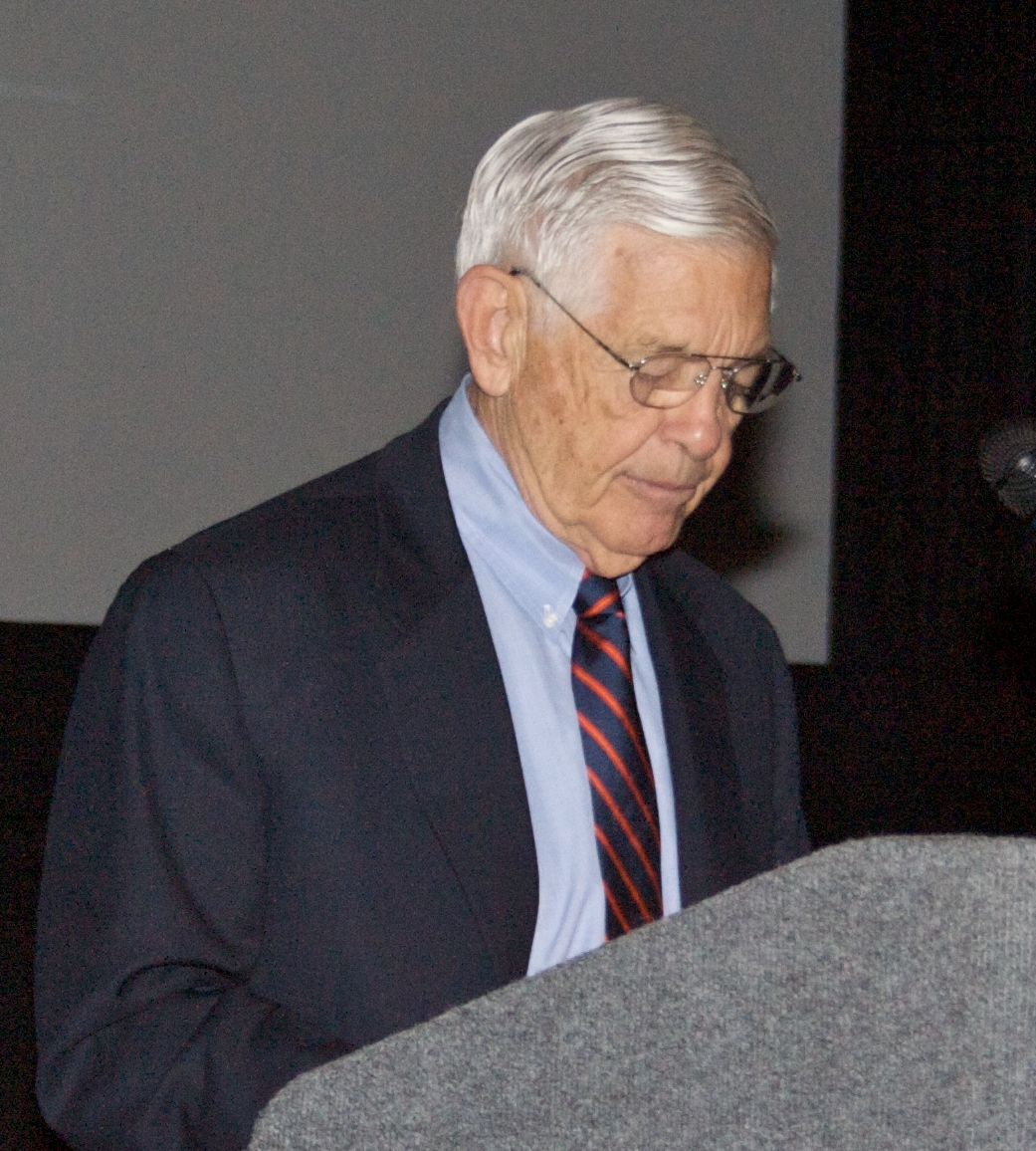
- McColl in 2009
- Born: June 18, 1935 (age 91); Bennettsville, South Carolina, US
- Education: University of North Carolina at Chapel Hill (BSBA)
- Known for: Former Chairman, CEO Bank of America
- Spouse: Jane Bratton Spratt McColl
- Relatives: John Spratt (brother-in-law)
- Website: http://www.falfurriascapital.com

Hugh Leon McColl Jr. (born June 18, 1935) is an American former business executive who was the CEO of NationsBank and the former chairman and the first CEO of Bank of America. Active in banking since around 1960, McColl was a driving force behind consolidating a series of progressively larger, mostly Southern banks, thrifts and financial institutions into a super-regional banking force, "the first ocean-to-ocean bank in the nation's history".

Tony Plath, director of banking studies at the University of North Carolina at Charlotte, described this transformation in 2005 as "the most significant banking story of the late 20th century." In 2012, journalist Matt Taibbi described the transition as "a cartoonish arms race of bank acquisitions that would ultimately turn the American business world upside down". As a young man, McColl along with a colleague, had envisioned creating the first truly national bank with branches from coast to coast.

== Early life ==
McColl was born in Bennettsville, South Carolina, to Hugh Leon McColl (1905–1994), a cotton farmer and banker and Frances Pratt Carroll McColl (1906–1987), an artist. He is of Scottish Presbyterian descent and had a sister and two brothers. Their paternal great-grandfather, Duncan Donald McColl (1842–1911) was an attorney who had developed the first railroad (the 50-mile (80 km) South Carolina Pacific Railway) and the first cotton mills in Marlboro County. He also founded the Bank of Marlboro, later headed by his son Hugh L. McColl, (1874–1931), followed by his grandson Hugh Leon McColl. McColl's father liquidated the Bank of Marlboro in 1939 during the Great Depression. He later bought a controlling interest in Marlboro Trust Co. As a youth, Hugh McColl went to work part-time at age 14 for the trust company and his father's cotton company, McColl Cotton Mills. He learned to keep books, securing payments, learning double-entry accounting and driving across North and South Carolina to make deposits.

McColl was elected student council president at Bennettsville High School, and class president in his senior year (1953). He was voted Best All-Round Boy in his senior class. His yearbook quotation read: "He who is talented in leadership holds the world's dream in his grip." After graduating from the University of North Carolina at Chapel Hill in 1957, McColl joined the United States Marine Corps and served a two-year tour of duty until 1959. Honorably discharged, he returned to North Carolina. According to McColl, his father pushed him into banking, saying that he "didn't have the brains for farming." McColl married after college. He declined an offer from his father-in-law, John McKee Spratt (1907–1973), a banker, attorney, and judge, to work at the Bank of Fort Mill, a small family-owned bank. McColl accepted his father's arranging an introduction to officers at another bank. Young McColl went to work as a management trainee for American Commercial Bank in Charlotte, North Carolina.

== Career ==
=== NCNB and Nationsbank ===
In 1960, a year after McColl joined American Commercial Bank, the bank merged with Greensboro's Security National Bank, becoming North Carolina National Bank. Vigorously competitive, McColl deployed a methodical, military approach to transforming the small regional bank, via incremental acquisitions and mergers, into NationsBank and ultimately Bank of America.

McColl became President of NCNB in 1974 at age 39. In 1982, the bank made its first major out-of-state purchase—First National Bank of Lake City, Florida. This was the first in a wave of mergers and acquisitions during the 1980s. This was initially a defensive measure intended to make NCNB and other major Southern banks too rich to be taken over by New York money center banks. Most of those were orchestrated by McColl, who became CEO in 1983.

NCNB made national headlines with its purchase of the failed First Republic Bank Corporation of Dallas, Texas from the Federal Deposit Insurance Corporation (1988). Over the next few years, it acquired more than 200 thrifts and community banks, many through the Resolution Trust Corporation program (1989 to 1992). In 1991, NCNB bought C&S/Sovran of Atlanta and Norfolk, Virginia, which was the result of a merger a year earlier between Citizens & Southern National Bank of Atlanta and Sovran Bank of Norfolk. The merged bank changed its name to NationsBank.

After the NationsBank merger, the bank acquired Maryland National Corporation (1992), Chicago Research and Trading Group (1993), BankSouth (1995), St. Louis-based Boatmen's Bancshares (1996), Jacksonville, Florida based Barnett Bank (1997) and Montgomery Securities (1997).

=== Bank of America ===
In April 1998, under McColl's direction, NationsBank bought San Francisco-based BankAmerica. Although NationsBank was the nominal survivor and the merged bank was (and still is) headquartered in Charlotte, the merged company took the better-known name of Bank of America. Among other later acquisitions, Bank of America in 2004 acquired FleetBoston Financial, thus ultimately holding the country's oldest bank charter (1784).

Strategically, McColl blunted opposition to the bank mergers and acquisitions by pledging in advance billion in loans for low-income neighborhoods, particularly with the creation of NationsBank and Bank of America.

=== Effect of McColl's merger strategy on the 2008 financial crisis ===
During the 2008 financial crisis, after McColl's retirement, Bank of America was dubbed "too big to fail" and received $45 billion in federal government funds. In a 2012 article for Rolling Stone titled Bank of America: Too Crooked to Fail, author Matt Taibbi attributed factors at Bank of America leading up to the 2008 financial crisis directly to McColl's creation of a coast to coast bank, saying the "concept of an overmassive, acquiring-everything-in-sight, bicoastal megabank was hatched" in a "terminal inferiority complex" and described McColl (along with Ed Crutchfield of then First Union) as having launched "a cartoonish arms race of bank acquisitions that would ultimately turn the American business world upside down."

=== Later work ===
After handing off day-to-day bank operations in 1999 and fully retiring from Bank of America in 2001, McColl partnered with other Charlotte banking executives to form McColl Partners, an investment banking firm which advises mid-sized companies on mergers and acquisitions with offices in Charlotte and Dallas, co-founded Falfurrias Capital Partners in 2006, a Charlotte-based private equity firm, founded McColl Garella (2002–2006) an investment banking company serving firms owned by women, opened Charlotte-based McColl Fine Art in 2003, and partnered to create New York-based MME Fine Art in 2005. McColl subsequently established and was chairman of MBL Advisors Holdings, LLC (McColl Brother Lockwood), a Charlotte-based company with his son-in-law, Luther Lockwood, as managing principal and providing wealth transfer planning, business succession and executive benefits services to business owners and public company executives. In 2009, McColl Partners joined an international network of investment banks called Clairfield Partners, which collaborates on international deals.

McColl has been on the board of directors of Sykes Enterprises Inc., Canal Industries; Atrium Health, formerly Carolinas HealthCare System; Charlotte Center City Partners; Charlotte Latin School from 1977 to 1982, Cousins Properties, Inc.; Faison Associates; Foundation for the Carolinas; General Parts, Inc.; NuTech Solutions Inc.; Harris Teeter; and Sonoco Products Company.

== Philanthropy, civic involvement ==
McColl has supported a broad range of academic, civic and arts causes for Charlotte, the state of North Carolina and the Southeast — strongly encouraging Charlotte's urban redevelopment (enabled by Bank of America's revitalization of Fourth Ward and building of Gateway Village in Third Ward), playing a key role in Charlotte's attracting the Carolina Panthers National Football League and the Charlotte Hornets National Basketball Association franchises, supporting Habitat for Humanity, chairing The Forum for Corporate Responsibility (2003), financing inner-city and minority-owned businesses, encouraging light and high-speed rail, and supporting civil rights and gay rights.

The headquarters of the Kenan-Flagler Business School at UNC-Chapel Hill was named the McColl Building upon its completion in 1997 in recognition of McColl's efforts on behalf of his alma mater. McColl has mentored students of the McColl Business School at Queens University of Charlotte where he served on the Board of Trustees for 19 years (1991–2005). McColl gave the initial for Charlotte's Teaching Fellows Institute, and McColl's daughter, Jane McColl Lockwood, is president of Charlotte-based McColl Foundation.

Many of McColl's philanthropic contributions have focused on his family. He endowed the Charlotte Children's Theatre which includes the McColl family Theater, funded the McColl Center for Visual Art (a Charlotte-based organization that promotes the visual arts in the Southeast), endowed an English professorship at the Norfolk Academy, Norfolk, Virginia in honor of first cousin Edith Pratt Breeden (Patty) Masterson (1922–1997, attorney, teacher), and endowed a professorship at the University of North Carolina at Chapel Hill School of Information and Library Science in honor of his mother Frances Pratt Carroll McColl and sister Frances Carroll McColl Covington (1932–1990).

"My mother taught everyone in the family to love books, and we have prospered from having access to them and, perhaps more important, knowing where to turn to find the information we need." Recalling hours his mother spent reading to her four children in Bennettsville, S.C., McColl said, "I think we were educated far beyond my school system."

In 1995 Bank of America bought a burned out church on North Tryon Street with the express purpose of converting it into an artist's residency. With McColl's support, and working with FMK Architects and Charlotte's Arts & Science Council, the structure was completely refurbished and eventually became the McColl Center for Art + Innovation.

In 1991, McColl purchased, restored, and relocated one of his great-grandfather Duncan Donald McColl's homes in Bennettsville, South Carolina and then donated it to Marlboro County. It became a new home for the Marlboro County Chamber of Commerce and The South Carolina Cotton Trail.

In 1998 and 2004, Jane Spratt McColl, with Hugh McColl, donated 400 acres (1.6 km^{2}) on the Catawba River in York County, South Carolina near Rock Hill, South Carolina for an environmental museum, possibly to be named the Museum of Life and the Environment, with building design by architect William McDonough.

== Rick Hendrick pardon ==
Rick Hendrick had started The Hendrick Automotive Group in 1976 as a single Chevrolet dealership in Bennettsville, South Carolina (McColl's home town), and sat on the Board of Directors during McColl's tenure as chairman of NationsBank, which in turn became Bank of America with McColl as chairman and CEO. Hendrick later pleaded guilty to mail fraud and admitted to giving hundreds of thousands of dollars, automobiles, and houses to American Honda Motor Company executives — eventually requesting a pardon from President Bill Clinton. McColl wrote to Clinton recommending a pardon for Hendrick and subsequently announced on December 7, 2000, Bank of America Foundation would donate $500,000 to the Clinton Foundation. On December 21, 2000, Clinton granted a pardon to Hendrick. McColl denied having a role in the bank foundation's contribution to the Clinton library, saying the foundation had also donated $500,000 to the presidential library of George H. W. Bush and $225,000 to the library of Ronald Reagan.

== Personal life ==
McColl supported Bill Clinton for president, at one time voted for George W. Bush, and supported Barack Obama for president. Speaking of his political viewpoints, McColl said in 2000,

I guess, by today's definition, I'm a liberal. The reason I am is, I believe that a chief guarantee of our country, of citizenship, is the right of freedom of speech, the right to be who we are.

Two books have been written about McColl:

- McColl: The Man with America's Money (1999) by Ross Yockey
- The Story of NationsBank: Changing the Face of American Banking (2001) by Howard E. Jr. Covington and L. William Seidman, (former head of the FDIC).

A 2008 book, Dearest Hugh:The Courtship Letters of Gabrielle Drake and Hugh Mccoll, 1900–1901 edited by Suzanne Cameron Linder Hurley, recounts via their letters the courtship of his grandparents, D.D.McColl and Gabrielle Palmer Drake McColl (1882–1964). Suzanne Hurley later wrote a book detailing the journey of the McColl Clan's journey from Scotland to Marlboro County. This book took ten years to create.

The library the University of North Carolina at Chapel Hill's South Historical Collection maintains a collection of approximately 8,600 McColl family papers. The South Caroliniana Library at the University of South Carolina maintains the Duncan Donald McColl Papers.

On Oct. 3, 1959, McColl married Jane Bratton Spratt McColl of York, South Carolina — daughter of a banker and sister of former Congressman John Spratt (D-SC). They have three children, Hugh Leon McColl III (1960- ), John Spratt McColl (1963- ), and Jane Bratton McColl Lockwood (1967- ) and eight grandchildren.

McColl is member of Augusta National Golf Club. In 2005 McColl, an avid quail hunter, leased 60,000 acres (240 km^{2}) of the Kenedy Ranch, a Texas Longhorn-cattle ranch in the Falfurrias ranch area of Kenedy County, Texas.

In 2010, UNC-TV conducted a series of interviews with McColl, titled Biographical Conversations with Hugh Leon McColl Jr., to air in three segments.

== Awards and honors ==
McColl entered the South Carolina Business Hall of Fame in 1990, in 1997 he was voted Tarheel of the Year, in 2005 he entered the North Carolina Business Hall of Fame, and in 2007, entered the Junior Achievement U.S. Business Hall of Fame. McColl was named "Family Champion" by Working Mother magazine (1993), he earned the Pioneer Award from the Organization for a New Equality (1996) and won the Applause Award from Women's Business Enterprise National Council (2001). In 2005, McColl won the Echo Foundation Award Against Indifference, founded in 1997 to carry the message of Nobel Peace Prize winner Elie Wiesel — a call to action for human dignity, justice and moral courage. In 2008, McColl was named South Texan of the Year, and in 2009, McColl received the North Carolina Award for public service.

== See also ==
- Bank of America
- Banking in the United States
- Bennettsville, South Carolina
- NationsBank

Business positions
Preceded by Company formed from merger of Nationsbank (CEO since 1983) and BankAmerica	Bank of America CEO; 1998-2001	Succeeded by Ken Lewis (executive)
