= TC Energy Center =

Skyscraper in Houston, Texas

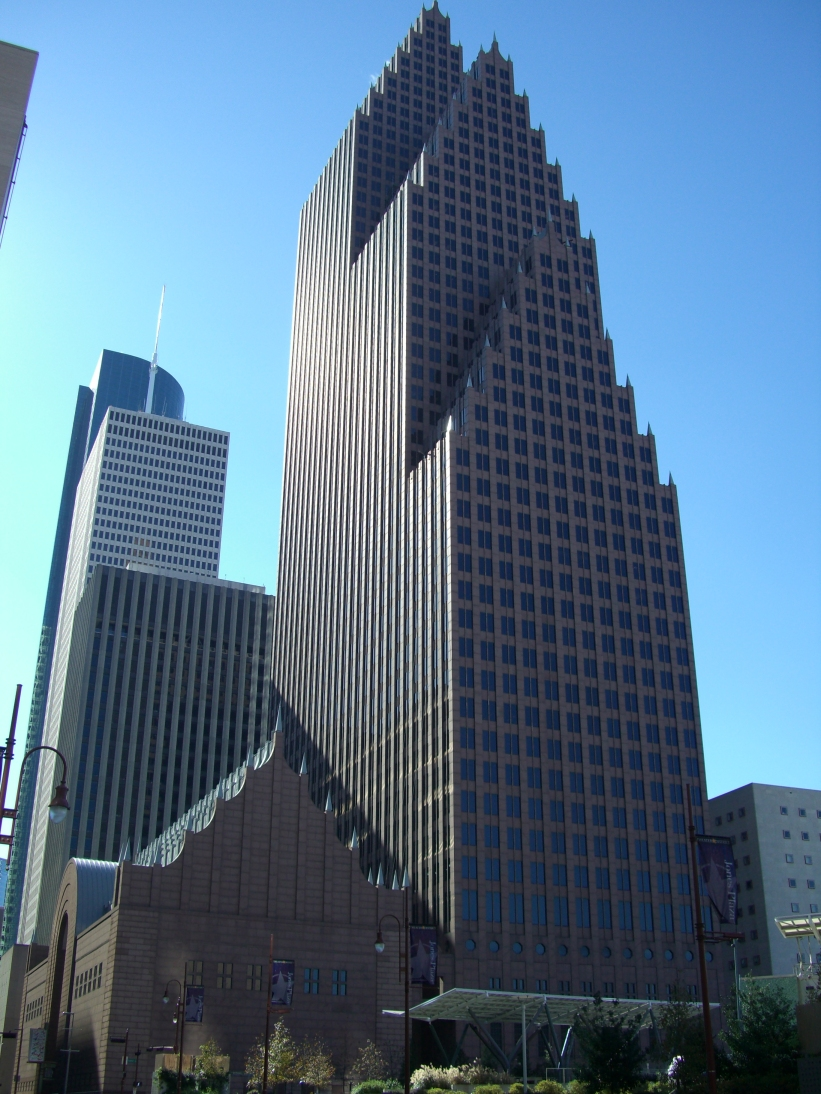
- Alternative names: RepublicBank Center; NCNB Center; NationsBank Center

General information
- Type: Commercial office
- Architectural style: Postmodern
- Location: 700 Louisiana Street; Houston, Texas
- Coordinates: 29.7605°N 95.3666°W
- Completed: October 1983; 43 years ago
- Owner: M-M Properties; General Electric Pension Trust affiliate
- Operator: M-M Properties

Height
- Roof: 780 feet (240 m)

Technical details
- Floor count: 56
- Floor area: 1,399,308 sq ft (130,000.0 m^{2})
- Lifts/elevators: 32

Design and construction
- Architect: Johnson/Burgee Architects
- Developer: Hines Interests
- Structural engineer: CBM Engineers, Inc.
- Other designers: Gensler (interior architecture)

The TC Energy Center is a highrise that represents one of the first significant examples of postmodern architecture construction in downtown Houston, Texas. The building has been formerly known as the RepublicBank Center, the NCNB Center, the NationsBank Center, and the Bank of America Center. The building was completed in October 1983 and designed by award-winning architect Johnson/Burgee Architects, and is reminiscent of the Dutch Gothic architecture of canal houses in The Netherlands. It has three segmented tower setbacks, each with "a steeply pitched gabled roofline that is topped off with spires". The tower was developed by Hines Interests and is owned by a joint venture of M-M Properties and an affiliate of the General Electric Pension Trust.

The banking center is housed in a separate building, due to construction problems, and has a three-story lobby. There are 32 passenger elevators each finished with wood panels that include Birdseye Maple, Macassar Ebony, Italian Willow, Tamo, and Kevazingo. The building contains an art gallery in the lobby and plans to host curated exhibitions.

The building was renamed for TC Energy in 2019, which serves as the company's US headquarters, and is the largest tenant in the building.

== Background ==
At 56 stories the TC Energy Center is the 101st tallest building in the United States and is the ninth tallest building in Texas.

The northeast corner of the structure houses a building within a building. On the site is the main Western Union building and when relocation of the telegraph cables proved unfeasible, a new structure was built over the site and the existing structure was incorporated into the new building intact. The stone used for the exterior is red Swedish granite, giving the building a "dark pink" appearance.

== Tropical Storm Allison incident ==
On June 9, 2001, the building was the site of an accident that took place during Tropical Storm Allison. Building security warned individuals that the below-grade parking levels were in danger of flooding and instructed persons working late in the building to move vehicles to upper levels of the garage. Kristie Tautenhahn, an employee of the law firm Mayer, Brown & Platt, went to move her vehicle parked on sub-level 3 at 10:30 UTC (05:30 CDT) which by that time was completely submerged. She drowned in an elevator car trying to escape water that had erupted out when a cinderblock wall that separated the parking garage from the tunnel system broke.

== Tenants ==
- Mayer Brown has its Houston office in Suite 3400.
- TC Energy has its US Head Office in the building.

== Gallery ==
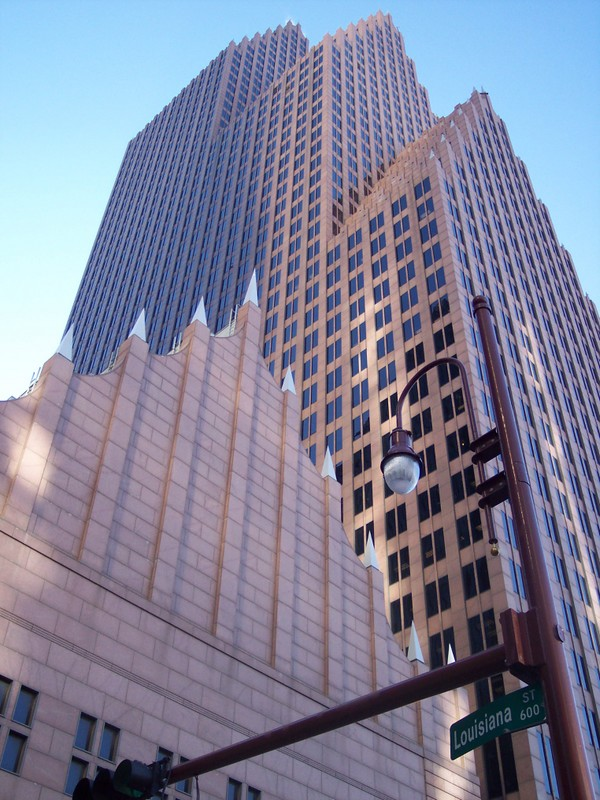

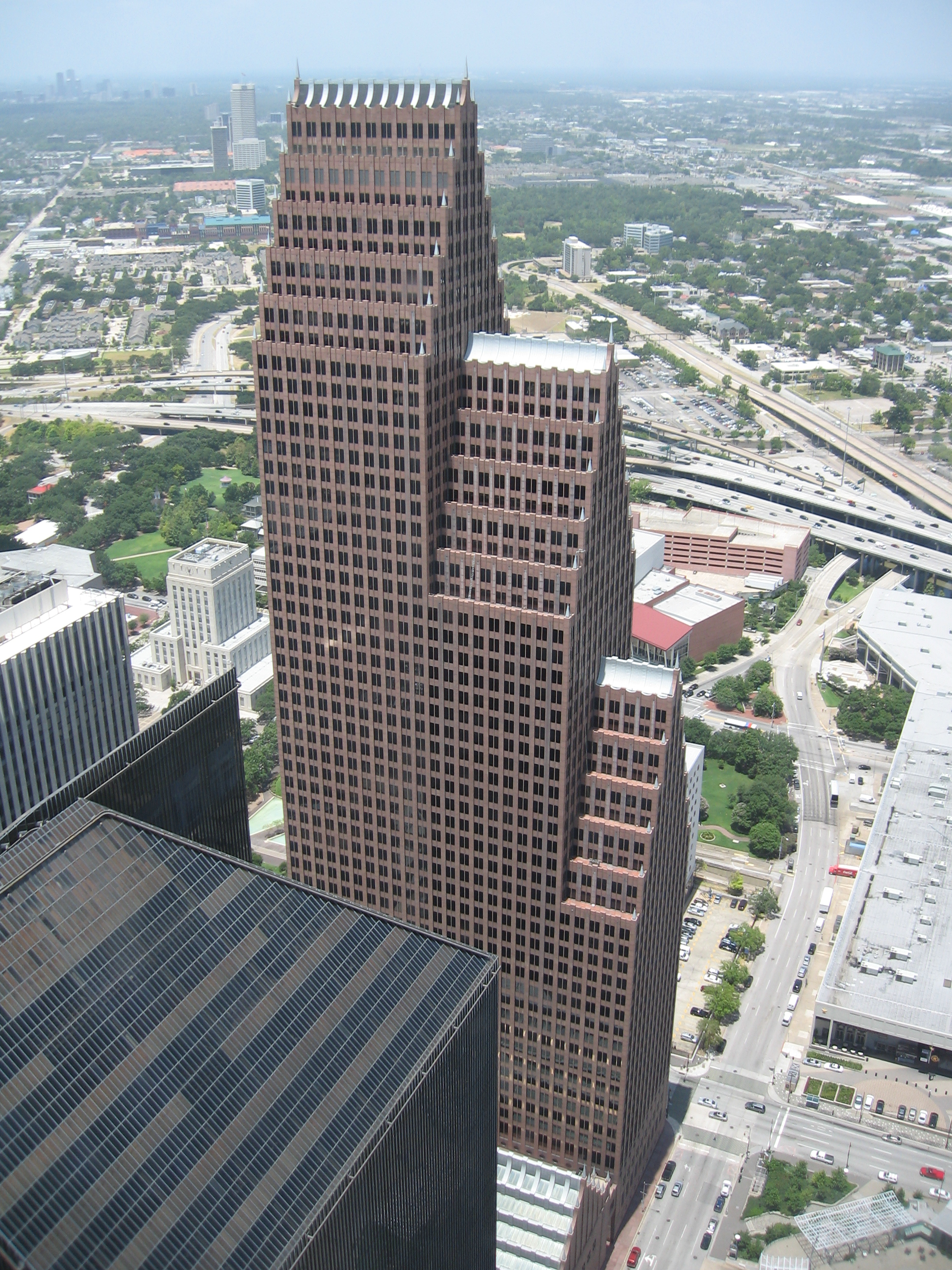

== See also ==
- Tallest buildings in Texas
- List of tallest buildings in the United States

== Bibliography ==
- Bradley, Barrie Scardino (2020). Improbable Metropolis: Houston's Architectural and Urban History. Austin: University of Texas Press. ISBN 978-1-4773-2019-8.
- Fox, Stephen (2012). AIA Houston Architectural Guide (Third ed.). Houston: American Institute of Architects, Houston Chapter. ISBN 978-0-615-66959-5.
