= Bank of America Plaza (Atlanta) =

Skyscraper in Georgia, US

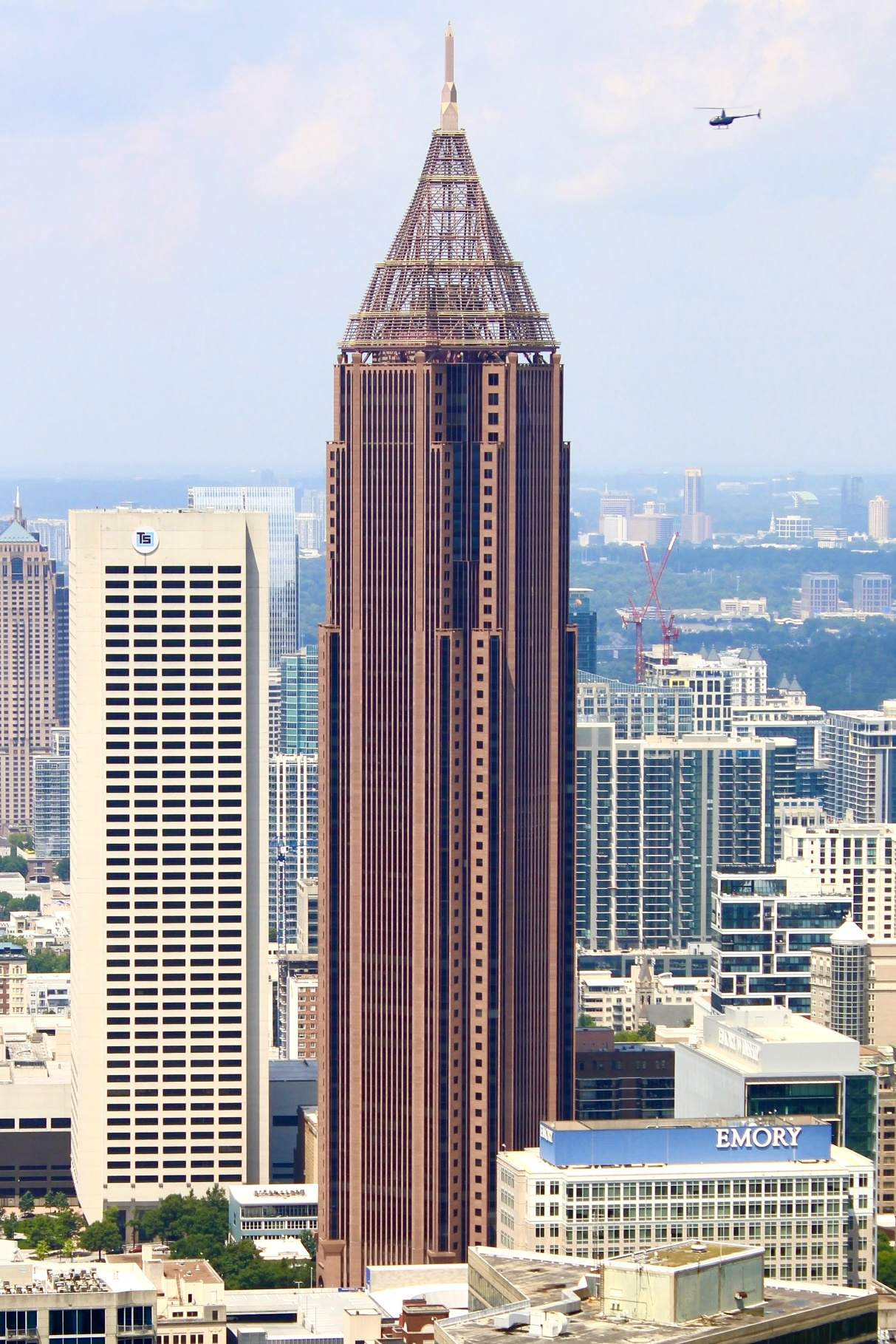
- The Bank of America Plaza as viewed from the Westin Peachtree Plaza in 2024.

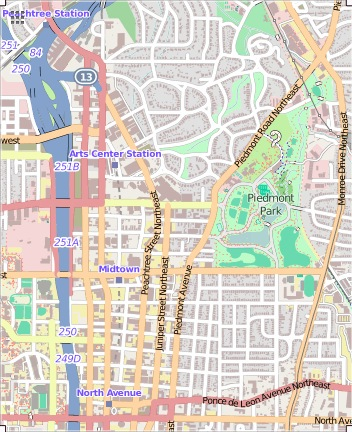
- Location within Atlanta Midtown Location within the United States
- Former names: NationsBank Plaza; C&S Plaza

Record height
- Tallest in Georgia since 1992^{[I]}
- Preceded by: One Atlantic Center

General information
- Type: Commercial offices
- Location: 600 Peachtree Street NE; Atlanta, Georgia, United States
- Coordinates: 33.7708°N 84.3861°W
- Construction started: 1991
- Completed: 1992
- Opened: 1992; 34 years ago
- Cost: US$150 million
- Owner: CP Group and HPS Investment Partners LLC
- Operator: CP Group

Height
- Architectural: 1,023 ft (312 m)
- Roof: 933 ft (284 m)

Technical details
- Floor count: 55
- Floor area: 1,312,980 sq ft (121,980 m^{2})
- Lifts/elevators: 24

Design and construction
- Architects: Kevin Roche, John Dinkeloo and Associates
- Structural engineer: CBM Engineers Inc.
- Main contractor: Beers Construction

Website
- bankofamericaplaza.com

Bank of America Plaza (colloquially called the pencil building) is a supertall skyscraper between Midtown Atlanta and Downtown Atlanta, Georgia, United States. At 1,023 ft (312 m), as of August 2025, the tower is the 25th tallest building in the U.S. The Bank of America Plaza overtook the 820-foot (250 m), 50-story One Atlantic Center in height, which held the record as Georgia's tallest building, and was the tallest building in any U.S. state capital until August 2025, when the Waterline tower in Austin, Texas, was topped-out. It has 55 stories of office space and was completed in 1992, when it was called NationsBank Plaza. Originally intended to be the headquarters for Citizens & Southern National Bank (which merged with Sovran Bank during construction), it became NationsBank's property following its formation in the 1991 hostile takeover of C&S/Sovran by NCNB.

== Architectural details ==
The building was developed by Cousins Properties and designed by the architectural firm Kevin Roche John Dinkeloo and Associates LLC. Designed in the Postmodern style reminiscent of Art Deco, it was built in only 14 months, one of the fastest construction schedules for any 1,000 ft (300 m) building. The Plaza's imposing presence is heightened by the dark color of its exterior. It soars into the sky with vertical lines that reinforce its height while also creating an abundance of revenue-generating corner offices. It is located on over 3.7 acres (1.5 ha) on Peachtree Street.

There is a 90-foot (27 m) obelisk-like spire at the top of the building echoing the shape of the building as a whole. Most of the spire is covered in 23 karat (96 percent) gold leaf. The open-lattice steel pyramid underneath the obelisk glows yellow-orange at night due to lighting. At its most basic, this is a modern interpretation of the Art Deco theme seen in the Empire State Building and the Chrysler Building. The inhabited part of the building actually ends abruptly with a flat roof. On top of this is built a pyramid of girders, which are gilded and blaze at night, with the same type of yellow-orange high-pressure sodium (HPS) lighting used in older-style street lights. Its design has been characterized as similar to the Messeturm in Frankfurt am Main, Germany.

The skyscraper, built at a 45-degree angle to the city's street grid, is set back off its eastern and western street boundaries, Peachtree Street and West Peachtree Street, by over 50 yards (45 m). This setback is filled, variously, by driveways, parking garage entrances, potted plants, granite staircases, and sloping lawns. The building directly abuts the sidewalk on North Avenue, its northern boundary, with access to this street through a parking garage entrance and stairs leading from the building's main lobby.

The skyscraper is across the street from the North Avenue station of the MARTA rail system.

Developers have rumored that the land under the surrounding driveways and lawns may be redeveloped into low- and mid-rise mixed-use buildings with street-fronting uses as the area urbanizes and the value of land in Midtown Atlanta increases. In 2014, new sidewalks, pavers, ADA ramps, pedestrian light-poles, improved tree wells, new bike racks and landscaping were planned. These neighborhood improvements were completed by 2016 at a cost of $1.04 million.

Upon its completion Bank of America Plaza was the tallest building in the United States outside New York City and Chicago, and the 8th-tallest building in the U.S. overall.

== Renovations and sustainable building initiative ==
In 2014, a $30 million renovation to the lobby, health club, and conference facility was completed. Following these upgrades, the tower achieved Leadership in Energy and Environmental Design (LEED) Silver certification. The building's management was also recognized by the Metro Atlanta Chamber of Commerce with an E3 Liquid Assets award for water sustainability, and named an EcoDistrict Green Luminary by the Midtown Alliance.

Following the $380 million acquisition of the tower by CP Group in 2022, a $50 million capital improvement program was launched to modernize the property. The renovation, completed in 2025, was led by Gensler Atlanta and Holder Construction. Upgrades included replacing the original lobby finishes with Italian marble flooring, champagne brass-finished aluminum panels, and a new tenant café named "Spire." The project also added 100,000 square feet of speculative office suites to the building's inventory.

== Building ownership ==
BentleyForbes acquired the building from Cousins Properties in 2006 for $436 million, a record price at $348 per square foot. In 2012, LNR and lenders acquired the property via foreclosure.

In 2013, CWCapital took over the asset management, sponsoring and representing the building's bond holders from LNR and hired real estate services company Cushman & Wakefield and property manager Onyx Equities.

In 2016, a fund managed by San Francisco-based Shorenstein Properties acquired the building. CBRE Group was hired to head leasing efforts.

The largest tenant in the building is Troutman Pepper, a national law firm.

In 2022, CP Group, the second-largest office landlord in Atlanta, and HPS Investment Partners acquired the building in a joint venture from Shorenstein Properties for $380 million.

== Gallery ==
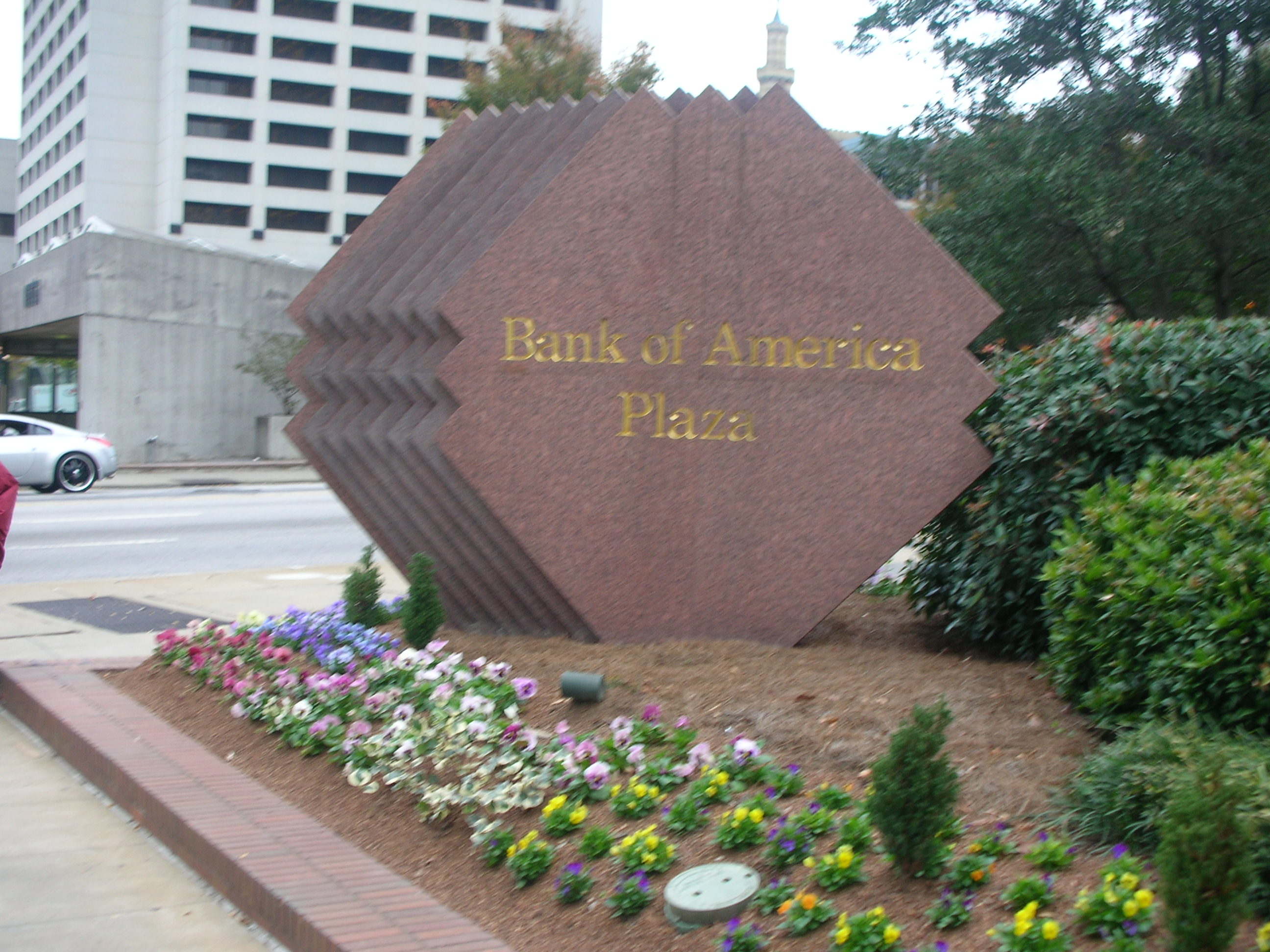
Street-level sign present on Peachtree Street prior to 2014 landscaping

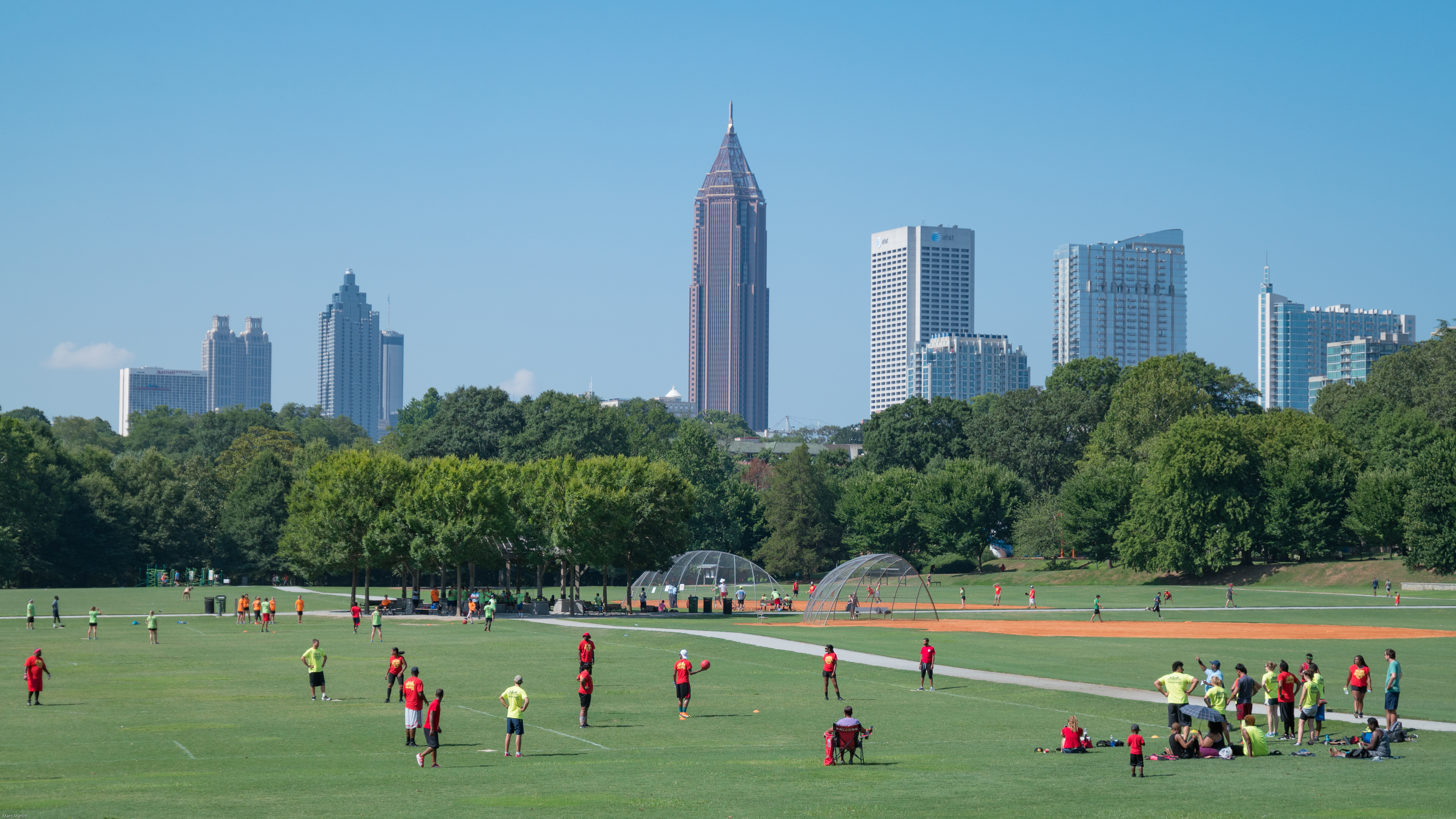
Bank of America Plaza viewed from Piedmont Park in 2016

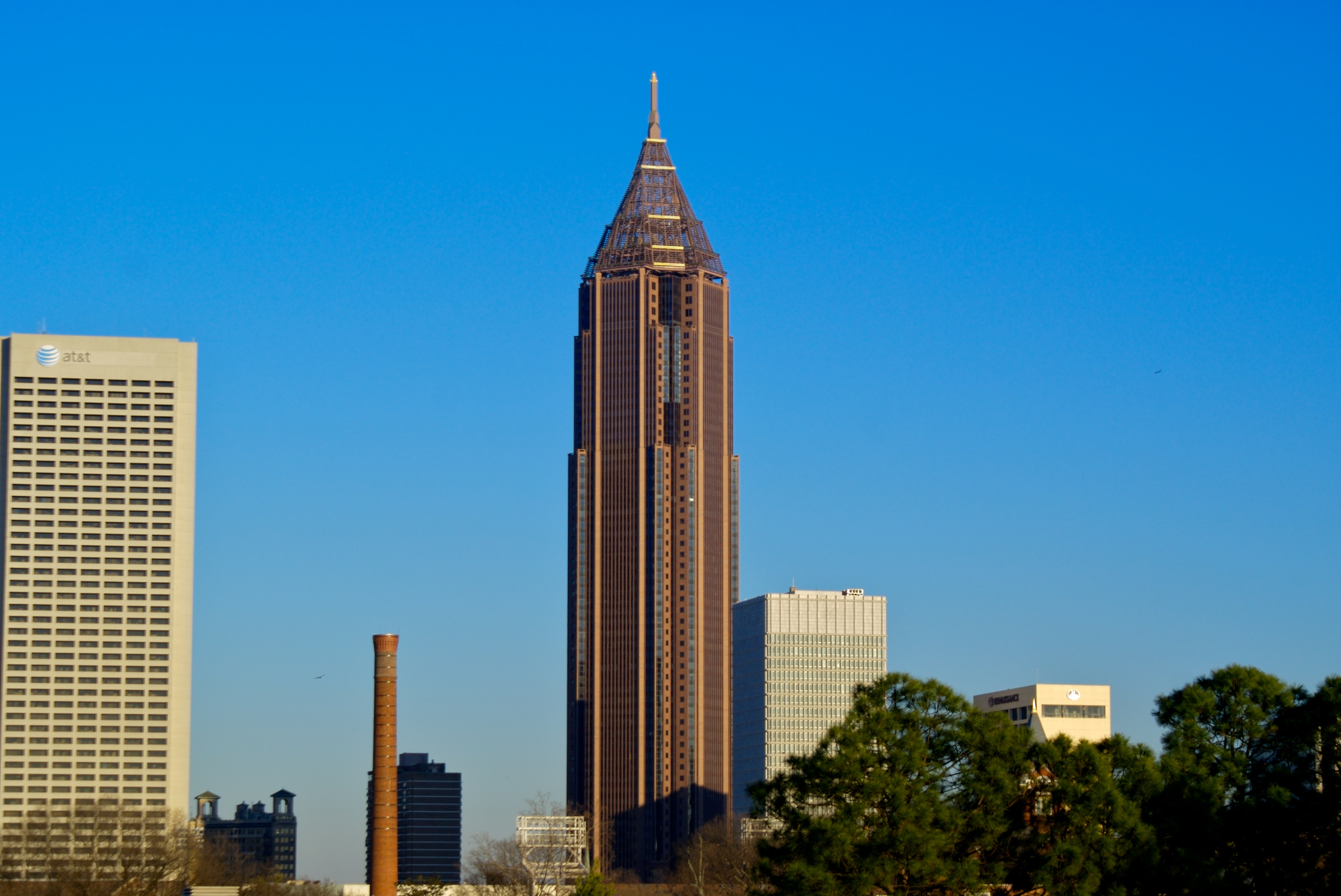
View from the west

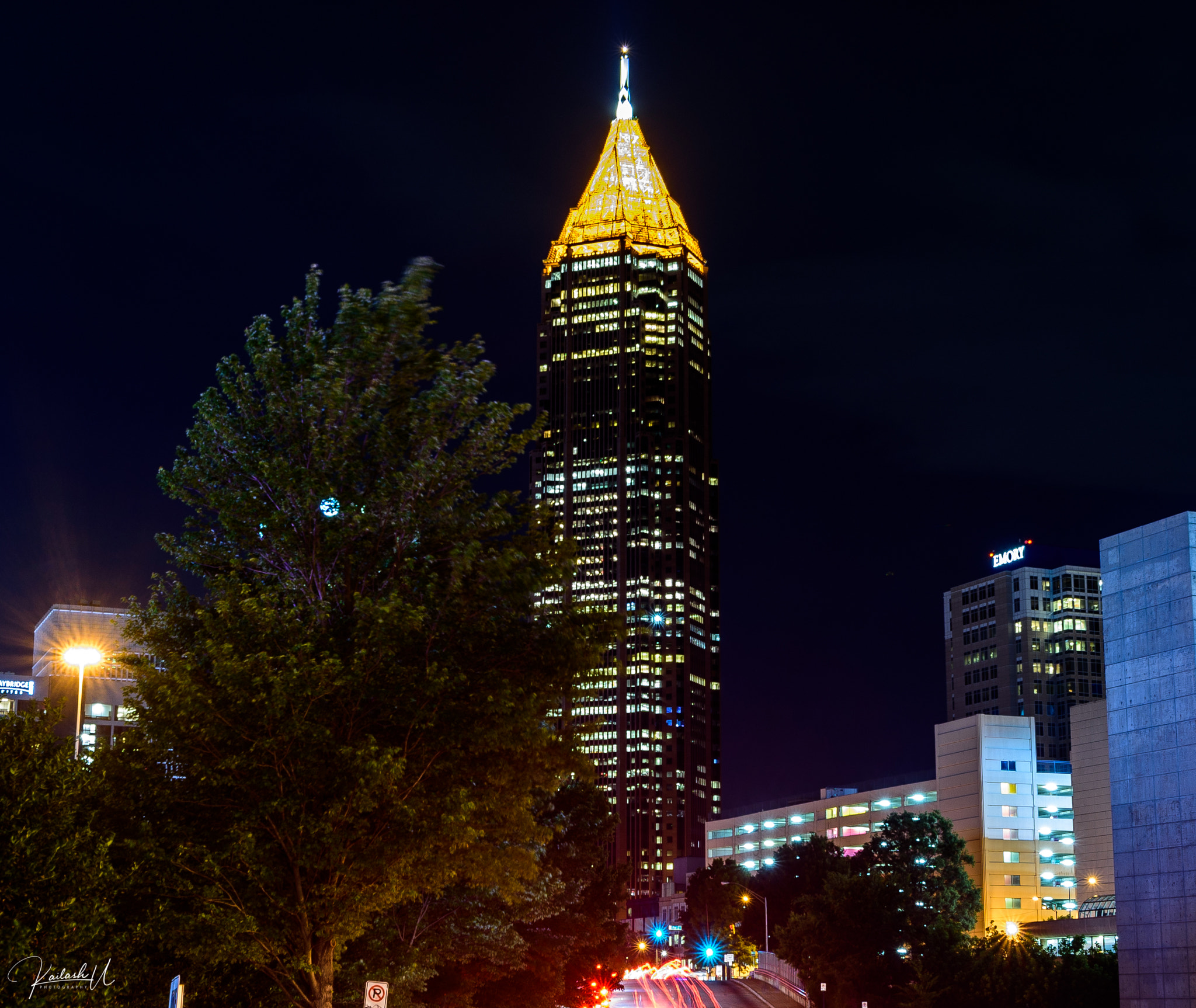
Night-time view from Ted Turner Drive

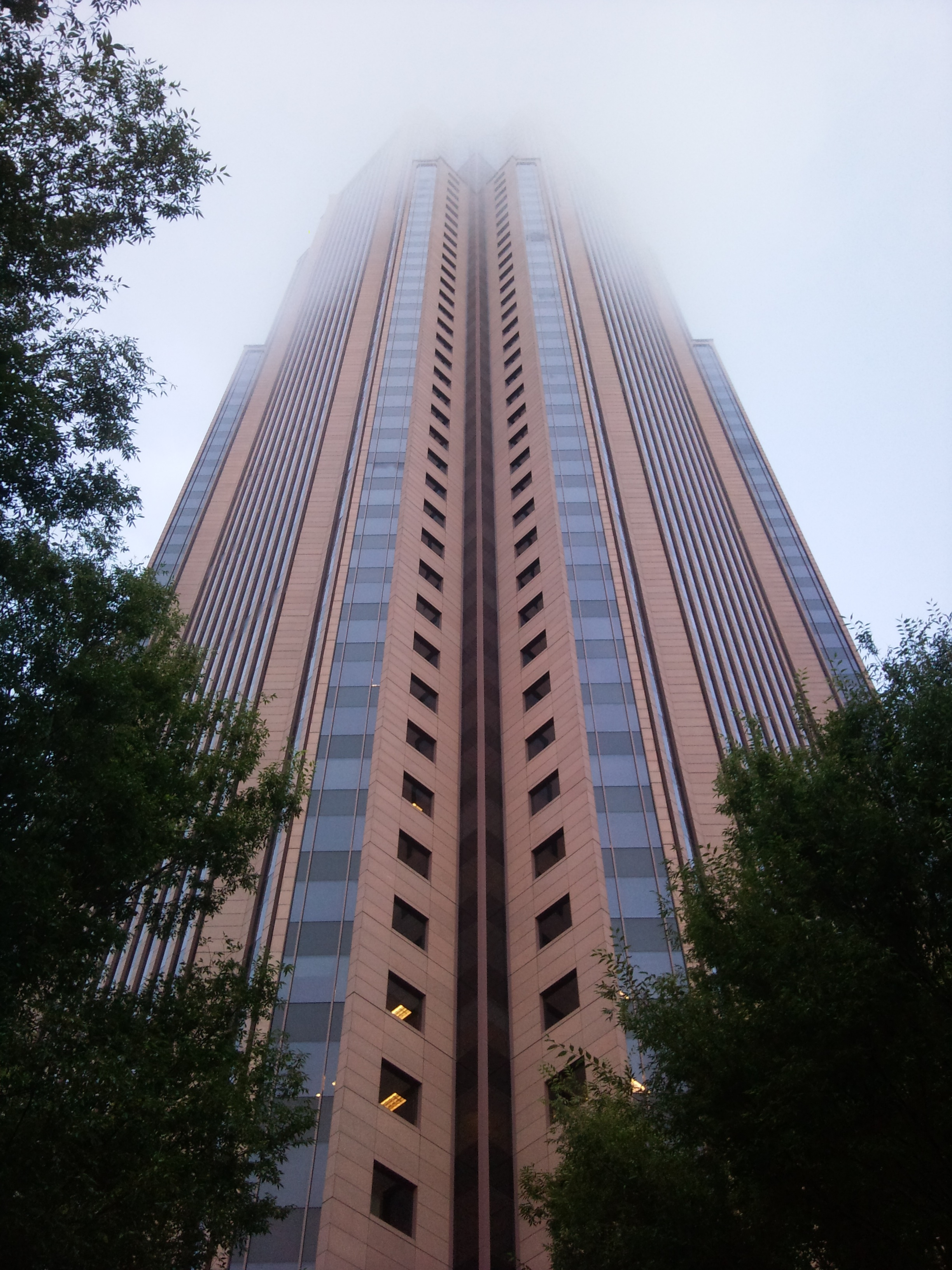
View of the building from street level

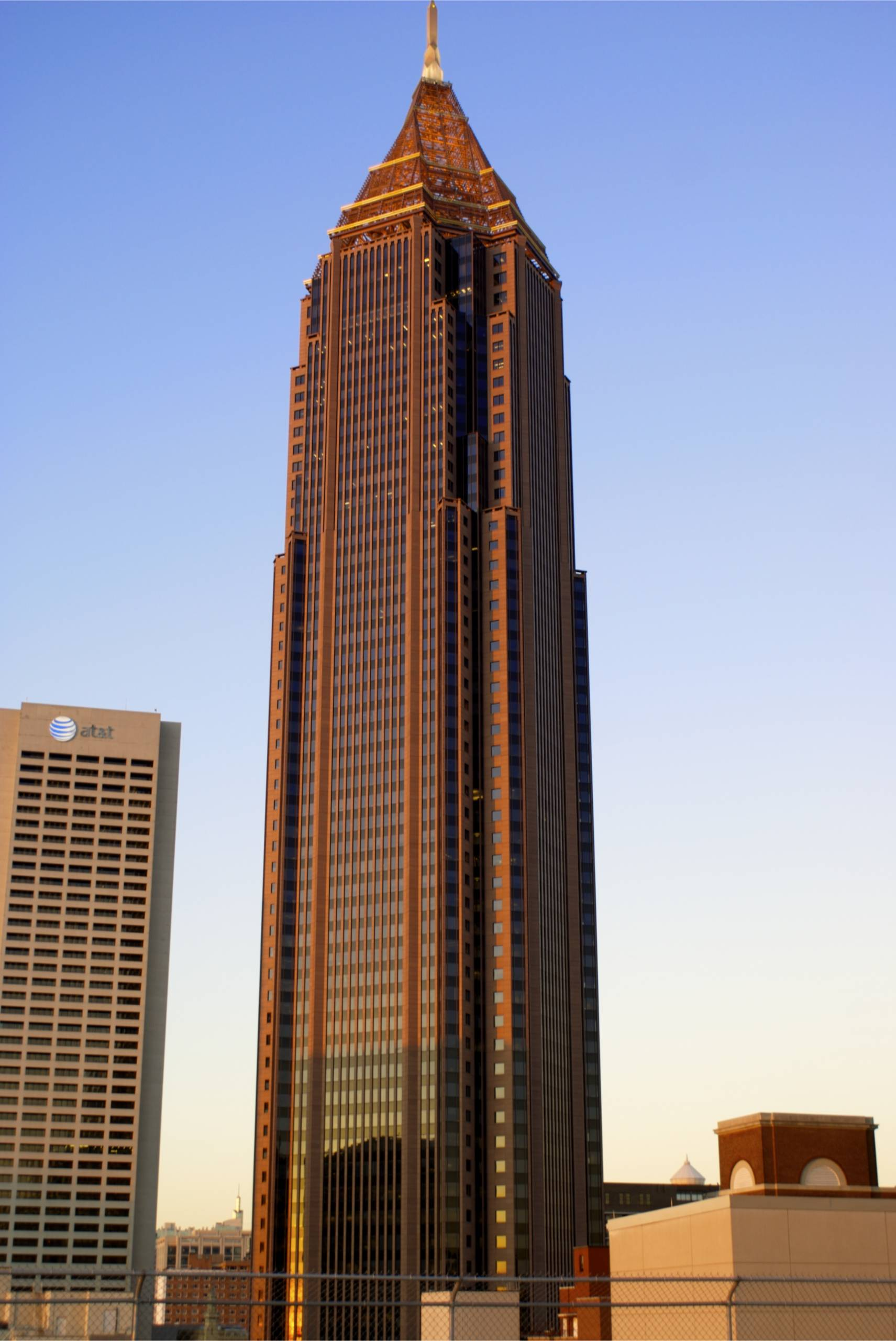
The building as viewed from Emory University Hospital Midtown

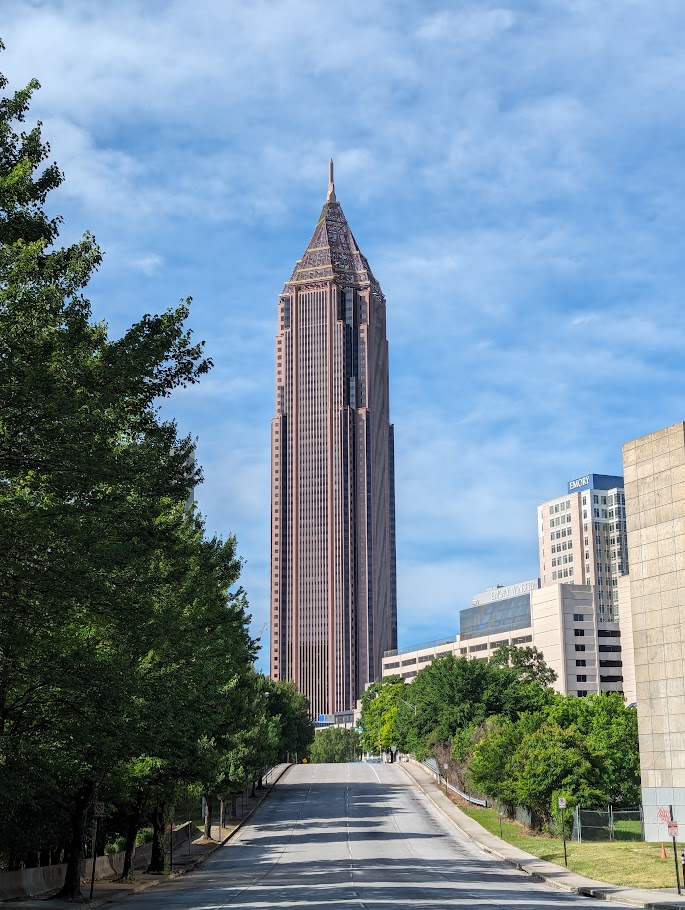
The building on a clear day, viewed from the south

== See also ==
- List of tallest buildings in the United States
- List of tallest buildings by U.S. state
- List of tallest buildings in Atlanta

Records
Preceded by U.S. Bank Tower (Los Angeles)	Tallest building in America outside of New York and Chicago; 1992–2016	Succeeded by Wilshire Grand Center
