= Thomas Weisel Partners =

U.S. growth focused investment banking firm

Thomas Weisel Partners Group, Inc.
- Type: Subsidiary
- Industry: Financial services
- Founded: 1999
- Headquarters: San Francisco, California
- Key people: Thom Weisel, Chairman and CEO
- Parent: Stifel Financial
- Website: www.tweisel.com

Thomas Weisel Partners Group, Inc., also known as TWP or Weisel, is a U.S. growth focused investment banking firm headquartered in San Francisco, California.

The firm was launched in January 1999 by Thom Weisel and other personnel from the former Montgomery Securities. In 1997, Thom Weisel helped to orchestrate a $1.3 billion acquisition of Montgomery Securities by NationsBank. The following year, however, NationsBank acquired BankAmerica Corp, which itself had acquired Technology-based rival Robertson Stephens. A culture clash and fight for control ensued at the newly combined investment banking units of what is now known as Banc of America Securities. In the process, senior bankers from Montgomery Securities secured backing from the Silicon Valley Venture Capital community and left to form their own venture: Thomas Weisel Partners.

Thomas Weisel Partners, heavily focused on technology, prospered during the dot-com rise that peaked in its early years. The firm, however, hit turbulent times as technology saw a tremendous downturn. Bolstered by diversification into areas such as healthcare and consumer products, however, the firm survived and continued to operate independently. In search of additional capital, the firm made its debut on the NASDAQ on February 2, 2006 under the symbol TWPG.

Following its acquisition of Westwind Partners that closed on January 2, 2008, the firm now offers a broad coverage platform across technology, media, healthcare, consumer products, energy, mining, and real estate. Equity and Debt underwriting and Merger and Acquisition advisory operations are supplemented by Research, Trading, Brokerage, and Asset Management units as the firm operates a full-service investment bank. Various divisions operate out of San Francisco, New York, Toronto, London, Baltimore, Zurich, Calgary, Montreal, Boston, Chicago, Cleveland, Denver, and Portland.

In 2010, Thomas Weisel announced its acquisition by Stifel Financial.
