= National bank (United States) =

Type of banking charter in the United States

In the United States, a national bank is an ordinary private bank operating within the federal government's regulatory structure, which usually but not always operates in multiple U.S. states, and is under the supervision of the Office of the Comptroller of the Currency. Depending on the matter, it also may have to comply with some U.S. state regulations. It is legally required to be a member of the Federal Reserve System. A national bank in the U.S. is distinguished from a state bank, whose permit or charter is granted by a state.

== Overview ==
The term national bank in the U.S. context originally referred to the Revolutionary War–era Bank of North America, its successor, the First Bank of the United States, or that institution's successor, the Second Bank of the United States. The first survives as an acquisition of Wells Fargo, while the others are defunct.

In the modern usage since the 1860s, the term national bank has taken a precise meaning: a banking institution chartered and supervised by the Office of the Comptroller of the Currency ("OCC"), an agency in the U.S. Treasury Department, pursuant to the National Bank Act. Inclusion in the bank's name of the word National, the designation National Association, or its abbreviation N.A. is a required part of the distinguishing legal title of a national bank, as in "Farmers National Bank" or "Citibank, N.A." Many state banks, by contrast, are chartered by the applicable state government agencies (usually the state's department of banking). The Federal Deposit Insurance Corporation (FDIC) insures deposits at both national and state banks.

The advantage of holding a National Bank Act charter is that a national bank is not subject to state usury laws intended to prevent predatory lending. However, in Cuomo v. Clearing House Association, L. L. C., the Supreme Court ruled that federal banking regulations do not preempt the ability of states to enforce their own fair-lending laws. There is currently no federal cap on rates. The federal government only requires that whatever rates, fees, or terms are set by issuers be disclosed to the consumer in accordance with the Truth in Lending Act. Additionally, from the 1860s until the program was retired in 1935, national banks could issue National Bank Notes, currency backed by bonds deposited with the Treasury.

Notwithstanding the name, many national banks do not have nationwide operations. Many have operations in only one city, county, or state. This is because of the McFadden Act of 1927, which prohibited interstate branching by national banks. That restriction was not lifted until Congress enacted the Riegle-Neal Interstate Banking and Branching Efficiency Act of 1994. In August 2021, Chase Bank became the first national bank to establish a retail presence in all 48 states of the contiguous United States.

National banks are distinguished from federal savings associations, including federal savings and loans and federal savings banks, which are financial institutions chartered by the Office of Thrift Supervision, an agency of the U.S. Treasury Department that was merged with the Office of the Comptroller of the Currency on July 21, 2012. Likewise, a credit union licensed under the Federal Credit Union Act is legally not a bank, although it performs many or most of the same functions.

== List of U.S. banks with "National Bank" in their name ==
- First National Bank (Mobile, Alabama)
- First National Bank Alaska
- Valley National Bank of Arizona
- City National Bank (California) in Los Angeles
- Crocker National Bank in San Francisco, California
- Florida National Bank in Jacksonville, Florida
- Atlantic National Bank in Jacksonville, Florida
- Citizens & Southern National Bank in Atlanta, Georgia
- Old National Bank in Chicago, Illinois
- American Fletcher National Bank in Indianapolis, Indiana
- First National Bank of Davenport, Iowa
- First National Bank of Mason City, Iowa
- First National Bank (Mount Pleasant, Iowa)
- Michigan National Bank
- National Bank of Detroit, Michigan
- First National Bank of Omaha, Nebraska
- Broad Street National Bank in Trenton, New Jersey
- Marine National Bank in Wildwood, New Jersey
- National Bank of Commerce in New York
- Fourth National Bank of New York
- Mechanics and Metals National Bank in New York City
- Franklin National Bank in Franklin Square, New York
- North Carolina National Bank
- Commercial National Bank in Charlotte, North Carolina
- Potters National Bank in East Liverpool, Ohio
- Delaware County National Bank in Chester, Pennsylvania
- Centennial National Bank in Philadelphia, Pennsylvania
- First National Bank (Philadelphia)
- Moody National Bank in Galveston, Texas
- Laredo National Bank, Texas
- Ranchlander National Bank in Melvin, Texas
- Woodforest National Bank in The Woodlands, Texas
- Suffolk Bank in Boston from 1865 to 1903

== See also ==
- National Banks in Meiji Japan
- National bank (disambiguation)
