= Ross Yockey =

American journalist (1943–2008)

Ross Yockey (11 Nov 1943 New Orleans – 13 April 2008 Seattle) was a writer, producer, author, and television journalist. He authored 21 books, most notably best selling business book McColl, the Man with America's Money, a biography about banker Hugh McColl. Yockey has written nonfiction, among them biographies of Zubin Mehta and André Previn, and fiction, including three novels about the New Kids on the Block.

== Career ==
In the 1970s Yockey won five Emmy Awards with his documentary Hide Them or Help Them, which uncovered mistreatment of the mentally handicapped. Yockey has also received other prestigious awards from organizations such as the Associated Press, the New York International Film Festival, and the Broadcaster's Promotion Association.

Yockey has taught writing at all academic levels, from elementary school to the graduate level. He received his B.A. from Loyola University New Orleans and his MFA in Creative Fiction from Queens University of Charlotte. He moved to Seattle in 2003 where he and his daughter, L. Beth Yockey Jones, ran Yockey Communication, a firm specializing in books for business. His wife, JoAnn Yockey (née Jo Ann Vivian Soab; born 1944), was a soprano who performed with the New Orleans opera company.

At the time of his death, he was working on a book about his experiences with Idiopathic Pulmonary Fibrosis.

== Works (partial list) ==
- Bookspan, Martin (1926–2021); Yockey, Ross (1981). André Previn – a Biography. Garden City, New York: Doubleday & Company, Inc. – via Internet Archive. LCCN 80-2746; ISBN 0-3851-5157-8; OCLC 6942931 (all editions).
- Yockey, Ross (April 2005). The Builder: The Croslands and How They Shaped a Region. Seattle: Abecedary Press, an imprint of Yockey Communications, LLC – via Internet Archive. LCCN 2005-901403; ISBN 978-0-9764-8390-8, 0-9764-8390-4; OCLC 71303973 (all editions).
- A Century of Quality: American & Efird People (1991)
- Craving Community: The New American Dream (2007)
- McColl: The Man With America’s Money (1999) ISBN 1-56352-539-9
- Miracle in Jerusalem: An Easter Story (1992) ISBN 0-8407-7682-9
- On Any Given Day (2000)
- Responsible to the Earth: The Remarkable History of the Port Blakely Companies (2007)
- Ruined Landscapes: Paintings of the Balkan War Zone (2000)
- Strictly for the Birds (2004)
- Bookspan, Martin (1926–2021); Yockey, Ross (1978). Zubin – The Zubin Mehta Story. Harper & Row – via Internet Archive. ISBN 0-0612-0400-5.

== Bibliography ==
=== Inline references ===
- Charlotte Observer (The) (17 April 2008). "Ross Paul Yockey" (obituary). Vol. 139, no. 108. p. 7 (section B; column 1, lower half; digital image 19) – via Newspapers.com.
1. Via Newspapers.com.
2. Via Legacy.com.
- Opera, live recording: Il trovatore (CD). Plácido Domingo, Montserrat Caballé, New Orleans Opera, Knud Andersson (conductor). Video Artists International. March 1968. OCLC 1230383112 (all editions).
Jo Ann Yockey, soprano, is uncredited, but sang the role of Ines – Leonora's companion/confidante.

=== General references ===
- Martin, Joe; Yockey, Ross (2000). "On Any Given Day" (book synopsis by the publisher). Archived from the original on August 28, 2008.
ISBN 978-0-8958-7233-3, 0-8958-7233-1
- Everett Library. Queens University of Charlotte.
- "Yockey Communication – Books for Business". Archived from the original on July 18, 2011.
