= Robertson Stephens =

US wealth management firm

- Industry: Financial services
- Predecessor: Robertson Stephens & Company
- Founded: 1971
- Founder: Sandy Robertson, Robert Coleman, Paul Stephens and Dean Woodman
- Headquarters: San Francisco, California
- Area served: San Francisco, New York, Sun Valley, Holmdel, Marin County, Austin, Seattle, Denver and Houston

Robertson Stephens is a wealth management firm serving high net worth individuals and family offices. The firm is registered with the United States Securities and Exchange Commission as an investment advisor.

Robertson Stephens was founded as boutique investment bank, Robertson Stephens & Company. It was among the most active investment banks in the technology sector at the height of the internet boom, underwriting 74 IPOs with a total value of $5.5 billion between 1999 and 2000. Robertson was the lead underwriter of some of the most prominent firms of the 1990s stock boom, including Switchboard, Mapquest, E-Trade and Vericity, as well as retailer Bebe. The firm was closed by its parent company, FleetBoston, in July 2002, as a result of the collapse of the technology sector and the end of the dot-com bubble. It had approximately 950 employees at the time it was shuttered.

In February 2013, Robertson Stephens reopened as a wealth advisory firm, Robertson Stephens LLC, providing institutional-level investment management services to individual clients until closing at the end of 2017.

In January 2018, with sponsorship from private equity firm Long Arc Capital, the current Robertson Stephens Wealth Management relaunched operations as Robertson Stephens Wealth Management, LLC. As of December 2025, the firm has over $8.7 billion in client assets with offices in California, Colorado, Connecticut, Idaho, Illinois, Massachusetts, New Jersey, New York, Rhode Island, Texas, Washington, Wyoming and Oregon.

== History ==
The firm's earliest predecessor, Robertson, Colman & Siebel was founded in 1969 by Sandy Robertson, Robert Colman and Ken Siebel. In 1971, Thomas Weisel, who would later found Montgomery Securities and Thomas Weisel Partners, joined the firm, which was renamed Robertson, Colman, Siebel & Weisel.

In 1978, Thom Weisel, the junior partner pulled off what was described later as a "mutiny" of the firm. Weisel became chief executive of the firm and prompted the departure of Robertson and Colman. Weisel changed the name of the original firm to Montgomery Securities.

Robertson left the firm in October 1978 and founded Robertson, Colman, Stephens & Woodman along with partners Robert Colman and Dean Woodman and many of the firm's leading bankers. The name of the firm was shorted to Robertson Stephens & Company in 1989. Robertson Stephens and Montgomery Securities would remain fierce rivals for two decades.

=== Changing ownership (1997–1999) ===
Robertson Stephens was founded as an independent partnership and remained independent until the late 1990s, when its ownership changed hands several times. In June 1997, the partners sold Robertson Stephens to BankAmerica for $540 million. The combined firm would operate as BancAmerica Robertson Stephens for approximately 11 months.

In 1998, BankAmerica agreed to a merger with NationsBank, which was by this time the parent company of rival technology investment banking boutique Montgomery Securities. The significant internal tensions between Montgomery and Robertson Stephens led to the sale of Robertson Stephens to BankBoston in 1998 for $800 million. Shortly after the sale of the firm to BankBoston, Sandy Robertson left the firm and was succeeded by COO Bob Emery.

Robertson Stephens would change hands again the following year when Fleet Financial merged with BankBoston in 1999 to form FleetBoston Financial.

=== Closing Robertson Stephens (2002) ===
Although its business was squeezed by major Wall Street banks such as Credit Suisse First Boston, and its leading technology banker Frank Quattrone, which swept in and grabbed the most lucrative IPOs, Robertson Stephens was among the most active investment banks in the technology sector at the height of the internet boom. Robertson Stephens completed the underwriting 74 IPOs with a total value of $5.5 billion between 1999 and 2000.

However, by 2001, Robertson was suffering from the downturn following the collapse of the dot-com bubble due to a lack of interest in new technology IPOs and a lack of companies well suited for IPO. Robertson Stephens lost $61 million of net income for Fleet during 2001 for its parent bank, FleetBoston Financial, compared with a $216 million profit in 2000. Fleet put Robertson Stephens up for sale in April 2002 and struggled to come to terms with a buyer. Bear Stearns and Jefferies & Co. were among the most active in discussions. Senior executives of Robertson Stephens also looked at a potential management buyout.

Ultimately, Fleet failed to find a buyer and made the determination to pursue a liquidation of Robertson Stephens in July 2002. Robertson Stephens was among the "Four Horsemen" firms devoted to technology deals in Silicon Valley along with Hambrecht & Quist, Montgomery Securities and Alex Brown. At the time of its closing in 2002, Robertson Stephens was the only one of the Four Horsemen remaining as an independent, operating firm in the aftermath of the bursting of the dot-com bubble.

=== Reopening Robertson Stephens (2013–2017) ===
Robertson Stephens reopened its doors in February 2013 at the original firm's location at 555 California Street, San Francisco, California. Robertson Stephens LLC was the parent company for four operating subsidiaries; Robertson Stephens Advisors LLC, a SEC Registered Investment Advisor; Robertson Stephens Securities LLC, a securities broker-dealer and member FINRA/SIPC; Robertson Stephens Asset Management LLC, an institutional asset manager; and Robertson Stephens Insurance Services.

=== Robertson Stephens Wealth Management (2018–present) ===
In 2018, the current Robertson Stephens, with financial support from Long Arc Capital, relaunched operations as a wealth management firm, providing investment management and comprehensive wealth planning services that include estate planning, tax planning, charitable giving, divorce planning, and retirement plan consulting services, with offices in San Francisco and New York. Robertson Stephens came under new management with CEO Raj Bhattacharyya, CIO Stuart Katz, CFO David Westbrook, COO Vikram Chugh and CCO Michael Curley.

In 2019, Robertson Stephens Wealth Management added a new advisor team opened an office in Sun Valley, Idaho. Later that year, the firm acquired Blue Blaze Advisors in Holmdel, New Jersey. That gave the firm 62 employees and over $3.9 billion in client assets with twelve offices in San Francisco, Marin County, Santa Rosa & Pasadena, New York, Sun Valley & Boise, Holmdel, Austin & Houston, Seattle, and Denver.

In 2020, Robertson Stephens acquired Vine Street Wealth Management and opened a Marin office. The firm also added 2 new advisor teams in Austin, Texas, and Vail, Colorado, expanding its expertise in divorce financial planning.

In early 2021, the firm acquired Collaboration Capital and opened a new office in Houston, Texas. In the latter half of 2021, Robertson Stephens added 5 new advisor teams and opened additional offices in Boise, Idaho, Pasadena, and Santa Rosa, California. The firm also deepened its presence in San Francisco, with 2 new advisor teams. With its addition in Santa Rosa, the firm also started its retirement and pension plan consulting business.

In 2022, Robertson Stephens acquired Vodia Capital, based in Lincoln, MA, as well as another RIA, LFS Wealth Management, based in the Bay Area.

In 2023, Robertson Stephens acquired Haymarket Wealth Management, based in Madison, NJ. The firm continued its expansion with the acquisition of Lifeguard Wealth, a California-based registered investment advisor and added a new advisor team in Jackson, WY.

In 2024, Robertson Stephens completed five mergers, including The Thrush Group in Connecticut, Three Points Financial in Colorado Springs, Rain Capital Management in Oregon, Ratio Wealth Group in Denver,, and North Barrington, Illinois.

In 2025, the company added The Nulman Group in Rhode Island, as well as expanding its presence in New York.

== Notes ==
- More losses at Robertson Stephens. San Francisco Chronicle.
- Deal Will Marry Longtime Rivals. Robertson Stephens, Montgomery together again. San Francisco Chronicle. April 14, 1998
- Treaster, Joseph B. (June 9, 1997). "BankAmerica to Buy Robertson, Stephens Investment Company". The New York Times.
- Robertson Stephens Profile
