= John Spratt =

American politician (1942–2024)

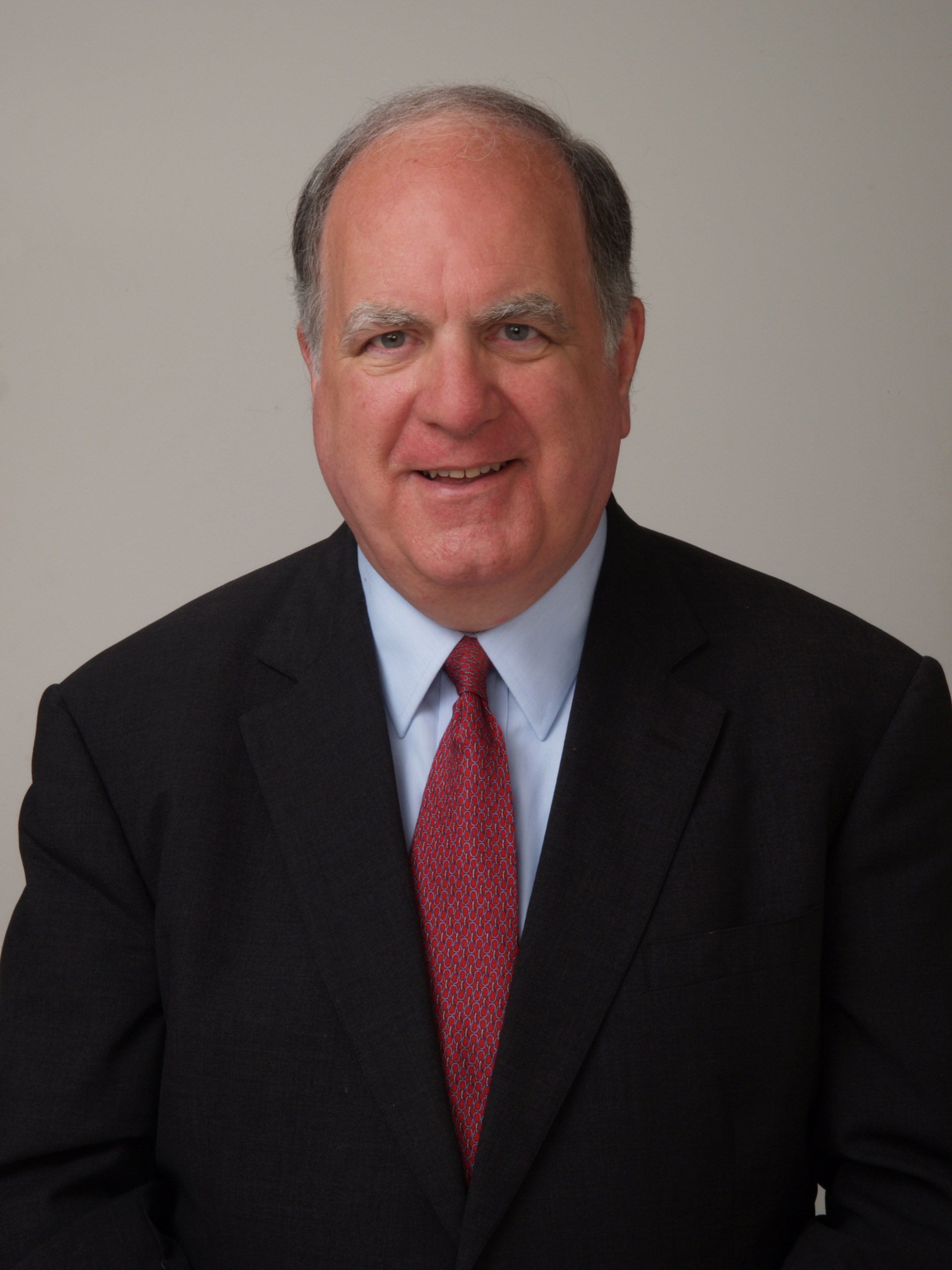

Member of the U.S. House of Representatives from South Carolina's 5th district
- In office January 3, 1983 – January 3, 2011
- Preceded by: Ken Holland
- Succeeded by: Mick Mulvaney

Chair of the House Budget Committee
- In office January 3, 2007 – January 3, 2011
- Preceded by: Jim Nussle
- Succeeded by: Paul Ryan

Ranking Member of the House Budget Committee
- In office January 3, 1997 – January 3, 2007
- Preceded by: Martin Sabo
- Succeeded by: Paul Ryan

House Democratic Assistant to the Leader
- In office January 3, 2003 – January 3, 2007
- Leader: Nancy Pelosi
- Preceded by: Rosa DeLauro
- Succeeded by: Xavier Becerra

Personal details
- Born: John McKee Spratt Jr. November 1, 1942 Charlotte, North Carolina, U.S.
- Died: December 14, 2024 (aged 82) York, South Carolina, U.S.
- Party: Democratic
- Spouse: Jane Stacy (m. 1968)
- Relations: Hugh McColl (brother-in-law)
- Children: 3
- Education: Davidson College (BA); Corpus Christi College, Oxford (MA); Yale University (LLB)

Military service
- Branch/service: United States Army
- Years of service: 1969–1971
- Awards: Meritorious Service Medal
- Spratt's voice Spratt supporting the 2007 College Student Relief Act; Recorded January 17, 2007

John McKee Spratt Jr. (November 1, 1942 – December 14, 2024) was an American politician and attorney who served as the U.S. representative for South Carolina's 5th congressional district from 1983 to 2011. A member of the Democratic Party, his district covered all or part of 14 counties in north-central South Carolina. The largest cities are Rock Hill and Sumter.

Spratt was the dean of the South Carolina congressional delegation, chairman of the U.S. House Committee on the Budget, and the second ranking Democrat on the U.S. House Committee on Armed Services, where he served on three subcommittees: Oversight and Investigations, Strategic Forces, and Air and Land Forces. In addition to his committee work, he co-chaired the Textile Caucus, the Bearing Caucus, and the Nuclear Energy Caucus.

In 2010, Spratt lost his seat to Republican challenger Mick Mulvaney.

== Background ==
Spratt was born in Charlotte, North Carolina, on November 1, 1942, and raised in York, South Carolina. His father founded the Bank of Fort Mill and the York law firm where he would eventually practice. His only sibling is Jane Bratton Spratt McColl, wife of Hugh McColl, former chairman and chief executive officer of Bank of America Corporation.

After graduating from York High School, he earned a bachelor's degree in history from Davidson College in 1964. He served as student body president at both schools. Spratt then earned an MA degree in philosophy, politics, and economics from Oxford University (Corpus Christi College) in 1966 while studying on a Marshall Scholarship, and an LLB degree from Yale Law School in 1969.

Spratt was a captain in the Army from 1969 to 1971, serving in the Operations Analysis Group in the office of the Assistant Secretary of Defense (Comptroller) at the Pentagon, and was awarded the Meritorious Service Medal.

Spratt returned to York in 1971 to practice at the law firm of Spratt, McKeown, and Spratt. He was county attorney and school board attorney, and president of the Bank of Fort Mill. He also ran a small insurance agency and owned a farm in Fort Mill.

== U.S. House of Representatives ==
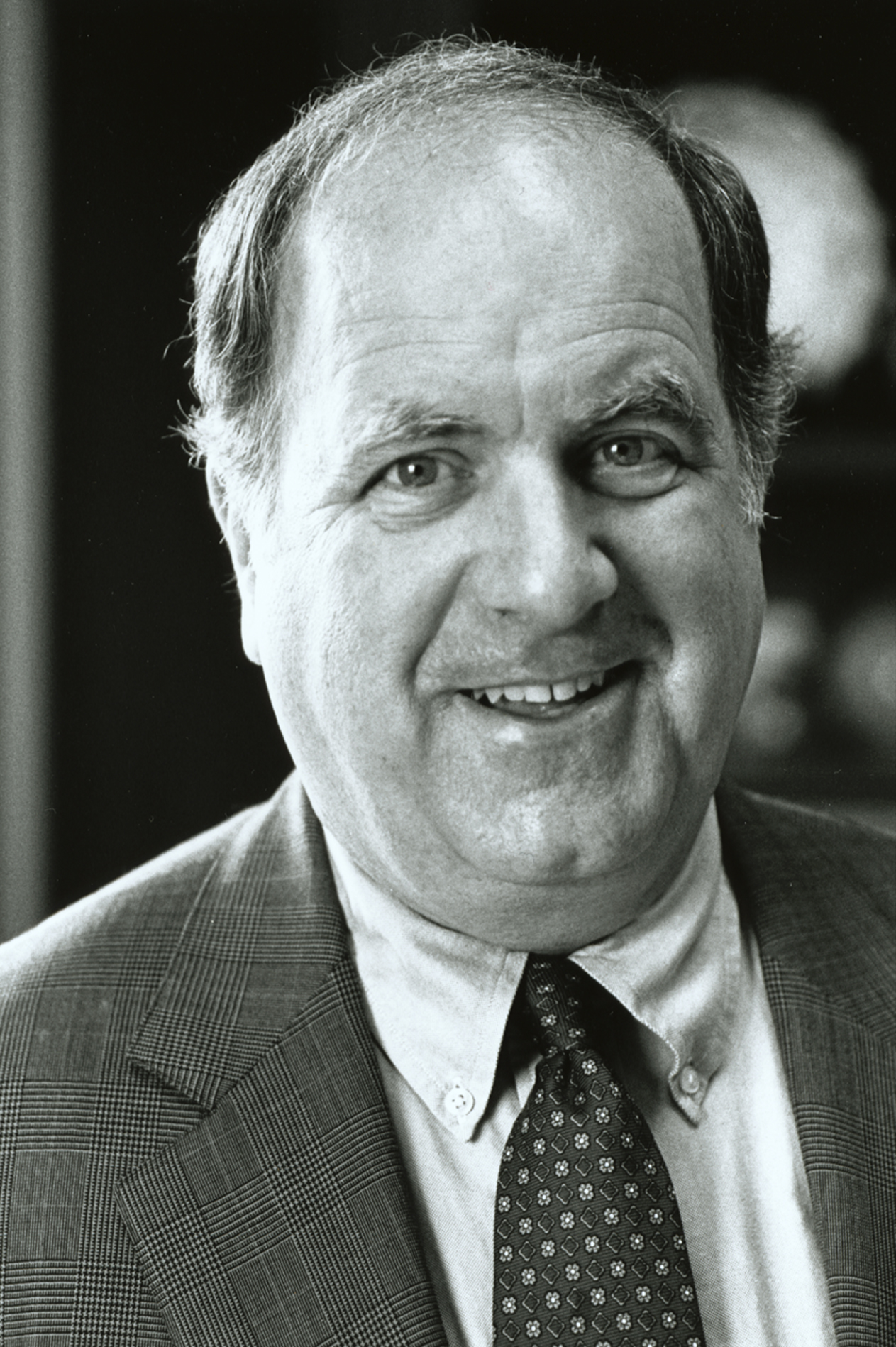
Earlier congressional photo of Spratt

For his work in Congress, Spratt won praise from Columbia's newspaper The State, which called him "one of his party's most reliable 'bridges' to the Republican side." National Journal featured him on its cover as "a stand-out" in Congress, comparing his legislative skills to the "best infielders in baseball." In a Washingtonian magazine survey, Congressional staff voted him a "Workhorse" and "House Member I'd Like to See Win the Presidency in 2008."

Spratt co-authored the Balanced Budget Act of 1997, putting the federal budget in surplus for the first time in 30 years. In 2003, Spratt engineered an amendment which shifted $30 million in the defense appropriations bill to the Airborne Laser program.

In the 111th Congress, Spratt supported legislation such as the American Recovery and Reinvestment Act of 2009, extension of unemployment benefits, increased infrastructure and labor workforce funding, increased federal financial aid packages, increased home foreclosure and small business assistance, reduction in estate taxes for 99.8 percent of estates, clean water legislation, health insurance reform, expansion of the State Children's Health Insurance Program, reforming of medicare payment plans, clean energy legislation, pay as you go legislation, defense authorization for the wars in Afghanistan and Iraq, and increased VA hospital investment.

On March 21, 2010, Spratt joined a majority of his House colleagues in approving H.R. 3590, the Patient Protection and Affordable Care Act, the Senate version of the health care reform bill. As chairman of the House Budget Committee, he made the floor motion which led to the vote on the bill. "I was where the action was when the bill had to be called from the clerk's desk," he told The Herald, a Rock Hill, South Carolina newspaper. "It was like sharing a moment in history."

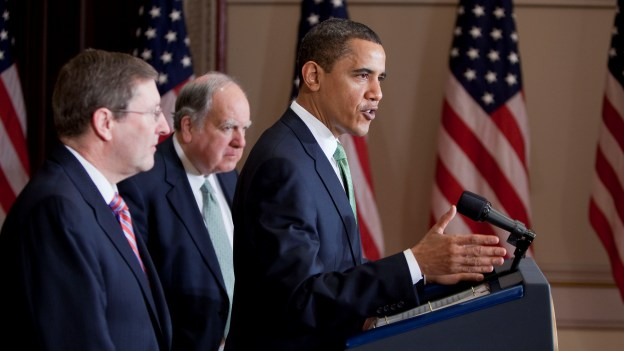
Spratt with President Obama on March 17, 2009

On March 24, 2010, Spratt was appointed to the president's National Commission on Fiscal Responsibility and Reform. In reporting on the appointment, Dow Jones Newswires called Spratt "one of the staunchest fiscal conservatives among House Democrats." One of Spratt's last acts in Congress was helping compile a 65-page report on fixing the country's financial deficit.

== Political campaigns ==
Spratt became active in politics within the Democratic Party at an early age, and was elected delegate to the 1964 Democratic National Convention, which he attended at the age of 22. Spratt was first elected to the United States House of Representatives in 1982, succeeding fellow Democrat Kenneth Holland. He was reelected 13 more times. Although parts of the district were becoming friendlier to Republican candidates at the national level, the GOP was more or less nonexistent in this part of South Carolina at the local level for some time; Spratt only faced a Republican opponent twice from 1984 to 1992, winning easily in both instances. In 1994, however, Spratt was nearly defeated by Republican Larry Bigham, only surviving by a margin of 6,300 votes. He defeated Bigham by a slightly larger margin in 1996, but from 1998 to 2008 Spratt usually won with relatively little difficulty due to his popularity and campaigning skills.

Spratt typically stayed out of presidential politics while he was a congressman because the national party was not popular in his district. For instance, he did not endorse any candidate in the 2008 Democratic Party presidential primaries. Nonetheless, he was rumored to have been President Obama's pick as White House Budget Director, though President Obama instead chose Peter R. Orszag, whom Spratt had helped hire as the director of the Congressional Budget Office.

=== 2010 ===
In 2010, John Spratt's re-election chances was the subject of numerous articles. He was seen as particularly vulnerable due to his ties with the Democratic party leadership, his district's double-digit unemployment rate, and the district's growing Republican base. He was defeated that year by Mick Mulvaney by a margin of 55 percent to 45 percent—one of the largest margins of defeat for an incumbent in the 2010 cycle.

Mulvaney successfully weaponized Spratt's bipartisan credentials against him during the election. He lamented that Spratt was no longer fiscally conservative like he had once been in 1997 when he helped balance the nation's budget and criticized his relationship with Nancy Pelosi. The National Republican Congressional Committee called John Spratt an "amnesiac" and stated he was forgetting what was going on in Washington. Notably, President Barack Obama flew into Charlotte with Spratt on Air Force One during the campaign. Spratt was among three Democratic U.S. House chairmen who lost that year to Tea Party candidates.

== Personal life ==
On May 31, 1968, Spratt married Jane Stacy of Filbert, South Carolina. They had three daughters, Susan Spratt, Sarah Spratt, and Catherine Spratt, along with five grandchildren, Lily Tendler, Jack Tendler, Max Tendler, Jane Grace Brennan, and James Brennan. Spratt lived in York, South Carolina, where he was a member of the local First Presbyterian Church. He was active in the United Way and other civic and charity organizations. He was brother-in-law to Hugh McColl, CEO of Bank of America and NationsBank. After his departure from Congress, Spratt served as Visiting Distinguished Professor of Public Policy at Winthrop University.

In 2010, Spratt was diagnosed with Parkinson's disease. He died from the disease at his home on December 14, 2024, at the age of 82. His funeral service was held on December 18, 2024, at York's First Presbyterian Church, followed by burial at Rose Hill Cemetery. At the funeral service, a eulogy was delivered by Jim Clyburn, congressman for South Carolina's 6th congressional district and Spratt's colleague in congress from 1993 to 2011. Clyburn described Spratt as "an inconspicuous genius and the most ordinary, extraordinary person I have ever known." Governor Henry McMaster announced that flags would be flown at half-staff on the day of his funeral.

== Committee assignments ==
- Committee on Armed Services
  - Subcommittee on Air and Land Forces
  - Subcommittee on Oversight and Investigations
  - Subcommittee on Strategic Forces
- Committee on the Budget (Chair)

U.S. House of Representatives
| Preceded by Kenneth Lamar Holland | Member of the U.S. House of Representatives from South Carolina's 5th congressional district 1983–2011 | Succeeded by Mick Mulvaney |
| Preceded by Martin Sabo | Ranking Member of the House Budget Committee; 1997–2007 | Succeeded by Paul Ryan |
| Preceded by Jim Nussle | Chair of the House Budget Committee; 2007–2011 | Succeeded by Paul Ryan |
Party political offices
| Preceded by Rosa DeLauro | House Democratic Assistant to the Leader; 2003–2007 | Succeeded by Xavier Becerra |
