= Thom Weisel =

American banker, businessman, and investor

Thomas "Thom" Weisel
- Born: February 1941 (age 85); Milwaukee, Wisconsin
- Education: Stanford University (1963); Harvard Business School (1966)
- Occupations: Founder of Montgomery Securities and Thomas Weisel Partners
- Years active: 1966 - present
- Employer(s): Robertson, Coleman, Siebel & Weisel; Montgomery Securities; Thomas Weisel Partners
- Known for: Financier for high tech companies in Silicon Valley

Thomas "Thom" Weisel (born February 1941) is an American banker, businessman, and investor. He was one of the pioneers in the development of the high tech industry in Silicon Valley. Weisel is the founder of Montgomery Securities and later Thomas Weisel Partners.

== Biography ==
Weisel was born in February 1941 at the Mayo Clinic, son of Wilson Weisel a prominent surgeon and Betty Amos Weisel. Weisel was raised in Milwaukee, Wisconsin, and graduated from Stanford University with a degree in economics in 1963. Weisel was a champion speed skater as a teenager and won five national age-group championships at speed skating, and came third at Olympic trials in 1959.

In 1966, Weisel received an MBA from Harvard Business School. He began his career as a research analyst working for William Hutchinson on the West Coast.

In 1971, Weisel co-founded Robertson, Coleman, Siebel & Weisel (the firm had begun with three partners in 1969). In 1978 Weisel became chief executive of the firm and prompted the departure of his co-founders Sandy Robertson and Robert Colman. Weisel changed the name of the firm to Montgomery Securities. Robertson left the firm in October 1978 and founded Robertson, Colman, Stephens & Woodman, the predecessor of the investment banking firm Robertson Stephens.

Montgomery Securities was behind numerous initial public offerings during the rise of tech stocks in the 1980s and 90s, including AMGen in 1983, Micron Technologies in 1984, and Yahoo! Inc. in 1996. The firm was one of four investment banks that, as a group, were referred to as the “Four Horsemen,” due to their prominence in the underwriting of the IPOs of many of the most successful companies in Silicon Valley at the time. From 1989 to 1996, Montgomery Securities raised $57.3 billion in equity and underwrote 293 IPOs.

In 1997, Weisel spearheaded a $1.3 billion acquisition of Montgomery Securities by NationsBank. The following year, however, NationsBank acquired BankAmerica Corp. The newly combined investment banking units later became known as Banc of America Securities.

In January 1999, Weisel, together with other personnel from the former Montgomery Securities secured venture capital funding from Silicon Valley investors and launched investment banking and wealth management firm Thomas Weisel Partners. The firm closed its first year of business with revenue of $186 million, completing $23 billion in transactions, including advising Yahoo! in their $4.6 billion merger with GeoCities. The firm's performance led Investment Dealer's Digest to name Weisel Investment Banker of the Year in 1999, and Harvard Business School used Thomas Weisel Partners as a field case for six years. Weisel also received the Lifetime Achievement Award from the National Venture Capital Association in 2006, in part due to the success of Thomas Weisel Partners. The firm became part of Stifel Financial in 2010, which Weisel joined as co-chairman.

=== Professional sports ===
Weisel has been active in professional sports as an investor, board member, manager, and participant for most of his career. In 1982, he was a bronze medalist in the U.S. Master's Skiing Championship. Weisel is also a five-time National Master's Cycling champion, and three-time World Master's Cycling champion (1990–1992).

Since 1977, Weisel has been on the board of the U.S. Ski and Snowboard Team and was elected chairman in 1983, a position he held until 1994. During this time, Weisel was responsible for merging the U.S. Ski Team with the U.S. Ski Association, and overhauling its governance and funding. In 1999, the USSA awarded him the Julius Blegen Award, their highest honor. Weisel was also honored by the United States Olympic Foundation in 2011 with the foundation's George M. Steinbrenner III Sport Leadership Award. The award was given in recognition of Weisel's financial support and leadership since 1977. In April 2018, Weisel was inducted in the US Ski and Snowboard Hall of Fame at a ceremony in Squaw Valley, California.

Weisel started Montgomery Sports in 1987 as a cycling venture. The team was renamed Subaru-Montgomery in the early 1990s, then Montgomery-Bell (for Bell Sports), and finally renamed for the U.S. Postal Service. He is also the founder of the USA Cycling Development Foundation and has served as its chairman since 2000. As chairman, Weisel reorganized and restructured the foundation similar to the USSA, revamping the organization's board and funding sources.

In 2000, Weisel organised a bailout of USA Cycling which was experiencing financial difficulties.

Weisel was an important financial backer of Tailwind Sports, a company formed to manage the U.S. Postal Service Pro Cycling Team (USPS), which cyclist Lance Armstrong joined in 1998. Weisel formed a relationship with Armstrong early in Armstrong's career and was a primary source of support and funding. In a 2002 article, Armstrong credited Weisel for founding and investing in the team in its early stages, before its championship wins. Armstrong had previously been a team member of Weisel's Subaru-Montgomery team. Tailwind Sports were the owners of the USPS team for the first five of Armstrong's Tour de France wins.

In 2006 Weisel contributed to the "Floyd Fairness Fund" with fellow Tailwind Sports owners to support cyclist Floyd Landis when he was accused of doping offences. In 2010 Landis filed a lawsuit against Weisel, Lance Armstrong, Johan Bruyneel, Bill Stapleton, Barton Knaggs, Tailwind Sports, and Capital Sports and Entertainment under the False Claims Act, alleging that the defendants had defrauded the federal government. A federal suit was filed in 2013, but the government declined to name Weisel, Knaggs, Stapleton, and Capital Sports and Entertainment as defendants.

Weisel vehemently denied Landis's allegations, and claims against him were dropped by a federal judge in June 2014.

=== Art collection ===
Weisel is a collector of modern art, and an elected trustee of the San Francisco Museum of Modern Art. Weisel also served on the board of trustees for the New York Museum of Modern Art from 1996 to 2011. His personal collection contains American art from the early New York school, the California figurative movement, and Native American art spanning 1000 years with a focus on the American Southwest.

In November 2002 Sotheby's held an auction of 21 pieces from Weisel's 700 piece art collection, including pieces by artists Willem de Kooning, Franz Kline, Arshile Gorky, and Wayne Thiebaud. The Sotheby's sale was expected to bring between $43 million and $60 million, but realised $33 million on the night, with eight of the twenty-one works left unsold at the initial auction. The star piece was De Kooning's Orestes which sold for $13.2 million.

In 2014, Weisel donated around 200 pieces of art from his Native American collection to the De Young Museum in San Francisco, and in 2016, the San Francisco Museum of Modern Art will rename three of its California art galleries after Weisel. Weisel also endowed the SFMOMA's curator of painting and sculpture in 2014. He has gifted pieces to the SFMOMA and NYMOMA from his personal collection including works by Mark Grotjahn, Wayne Thiebaud, Richard Serra, Andreas Gursky.

=== Personal ===
In 2010, Weisel married his current wife, Janet Barnes. Barnes spent 25 years in the finance industry, and currently serves on the board of the de Young Museum of Fine Arts. Outside of her professional roles, Barnes is also a mountain climber, skier, and cyclist.

Weisel has seven children (six living and one deceased) and eight grandchildren. The oldest three children are employed in real estate development, investment management, and educational publishing. The youngest three currently attend school. Weisel's third son won the U18 National Slalom Championship in 2013 and served on the U.S. Ski Team. His second son died in 2017 due to complications from lupus.

In 2003 Richard L. Brandt wrote a biography of Weisel, Capital Instincts: Life As an Entrepreneur, Financier, and Athlete.
