= Fourth National Bank =

Fourth National Bank may refer to:

- Fourth National Bank of Atlanta - whose headquarters now houses the Andrew Young School of Policy Studies
- Fourth National Bank of Chicago
- Fourth Financial Corporation of Wichita, Kansas
- Fourth National Bank of New York
