= C&S =

C&S may refer to:

- Citizens & Southern National Bank
- C&S Wholesale Grocers
- Colorado and Southern Railway
- Confidence and supply
- Charleston and Savannah Railway
- Chopped and screwed, a musical technique
- Chivalry & Sorcery role playing game
- Chase & Status a drum & bass producer duo
- Culture and sensitivity
