= Boatmen's Bancshares =

Bank holding company

Boatmen's Bancshares Inc.
- Industry: Bank holding company
- Founded: 1847
- Defunct: 1996
- Fate: Acquired by NationsBank
- Successor: NationsBank (now Bank of America)
- Headquarters: St. Louis, Missouri
- Products: Financial services
- Number of employees: 17,863
- Subsidiaries: Boatmen's Trust Company; Fourth Financial Corporation; Sunwest Bank; Superior Federal Bank, F.S.B.; FKF, Inc.; Security Bancshares, Inc.; Catoosa Bancshares, Inc.; Founders Bancorporation, Inc.; Eighth and Taylor Corp.

Boatmen's Bancshares Inc. was one of the 30 largest bank holding companies in the United States when it was acquired by NationsBank in 1996. Until its acquisition, Boatmen's traded on NASDAQ with the ticker BOAT.

The company, founded in St. Louis, Missouri, in 1847, claimed to be the oldest bank west of the Mississippi River at the time of its acquisition.

== History ==
The bank was founded by George Knight Budd whose family had a fortune based in Philadelphia on the East Coast. He was to serve as St. Louis councilman and arranged for the purchase of the land that now forms the municipal building complex including the St. Louis City Hall.

According to company legend, Budd started Boatmen's Savings Institution to help the working class; many of whom worked on riverboats on the Mississippi.

The bank received its state charter on February 16, 1847, and offered 3 percent interest on deposits and invested the first $1,000 in a city bond that paid 6 percent.

Its early history was marked by deadly citywide disasters in 1849 of a cholera outbreak that killed more than 1,000 and the Great St. Louis Fire of 1849 of May 17–18 that destroyed 23 steamers and at least 430 buildings.

Compounding the bank's problems was the April 5, 1854, robbery in which the bank's secretary Joseph Thornton was implicated because the vault had been opened at night with a bank key. Testifying against him was Joseph Charless, president of the Bank of Missouri, who had received for deposit water and mud-soaked notes from Thornton. Thornton was acquitted but was to shoot and kill Charless on the street afterwards. Thornton was nearly lynched, and later hanged following a trial.

According to company legend, a run on the bank in 1855 was halted when a madame from a bordello deposited $4,500 in gold.

It became Boatmen's Saving Bank in 1873, Boatmen's Bank in 1890, and Boatmen's National Bank of St. Louis in 1926 when it became a national bank. In 1969, it formed Boatmen's Bancshares as a holding company and began an acquisition of banks throughout the region including CharterCorp of Kansas City, Missouri, and General Bancshares.

In the 1980s, it became the largest bank group in Missouri with the acquisition of Centerre Bancorporation. In 1981, it moved its headquarters to the 31-story Boatmen's Bank Building in Downtown St. Louis.

William H. T. Bush, younger brother of President George H. W. Bush, was president of the bank (but not the holding company) from 1978 to 1986.

In early 1992, Boatmen's Bancshares acquired First Interstate of Iowa Inc. (NASDAQ: FIIA).

In 1995 it had $33.4 billion in assets and 17,863 employees. That year, it acquired Fourth Financial Corporation and Worthen Banking Corp. The latter being a publicly traded company listed on the American Stock Exchange.

In 1996, it was purchased by NationsBank for $9.6 billion. NationsBank, in turn, merged with and took the name of Bank of America.
