= Commercial National Bank =

American bank

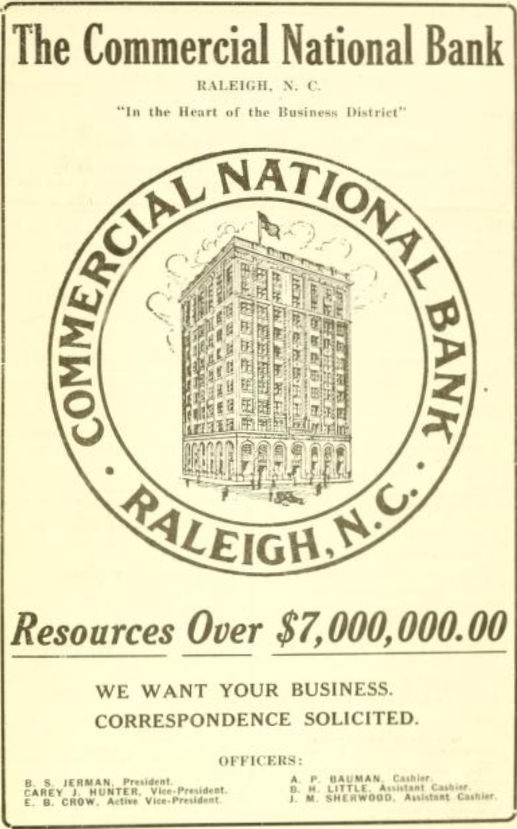
1923 advertisement in Raleigh, North Carolina

Commercial National Bank was a bank formed in Charlotte, North Carolina, on 18 February 1874, which was a predecessor to the American Commercial Bank which then helped form North Carolina National Bank. NCNB changed their name to NationsBank in 1991 and then again to Bank of America in 1999 through a series of mergers and acquisitions. Commercial National "is the oldest national banking institution in North Carolina." Commercial National Bank and the American Trust Company shared a building in Charlotte prior to their merger in 1958 as American Commercial Bank.
