= Sovran Bank =

Defunct US-based bank in Virginia

- Industry: Financial services
- Founded: 1983; 43 years ago
- Defunct: 1990; 36 years ago
- Fate: Merged with North Carolina National Bank to form NationsBank
- Successor: NationsBank (now Bank of America)
- Headquarters: Norfolk, Virginia, United States
- Products: Commercial banking Retail banking
- Parent: Sovran Financial Corporation (1983–1990); C&S/Sovran Corporation (1990–1991)

Sovran Bank was a regional bank that operated in Virginia between 1983 and 1990. It was the primary subsidiary of Sovran Financial Corporation, a bank holding company. It was formed from the 1983 merger of First & Merchants Bank of and Virginia National Bankshares, both of which could trace back their history to the 1860s. In 1990, Sovran merged with Citizens & Southern National Bank to form C&S/Sovran Corp., which in 1991, merged with North Carolina National Bank to form NationsBank. That bank became Bank of America in 1998.

The name Sovran came from Glenn Monigle & Associates as a simple spelling of "sovereign".

== History ==
=== First & Merchants Bank ===
Richmond had no bank after the federal government had revoked charters of banks whose loyalty was questioned. Eight days after the surrender of Robert E. Lee after the Battle of Appomattox Court House, the city's financial leaders started a new federally chartered bank. First National Bank opened for business in the Customs House. Lee was one of the new bank's early customers.

It merged with National Exchange Bank and moved to 10th and Main streets. Despite the Panic of 1893, First National Bank had the most assets of any Richmond bank by 1900.

National Bank of Virginia merged with First National on September 1, 1912.

Alfred Charles Bossom of Clinton & Russell in New York City designed the First National Bank Building, the first skyscraper in Richmond, at 9th and Main streets, completed in 1913. BB&T later occupied the building, which is on the National Register of Historic Places.

Merchants National Bank merged with First National on February 27, 1926, at which time the bank became First & Merchants Bank.

In 1981, The National Bank of Fairfax merged with First & Merchants Bank. The first bank in Fairfax, Virginia, it was organized in 1902.

Banks which merged with First & Merchants Bank:

- Savings Bank & Trust Co., January 30, 1959
- First National Bank, Ashland, Virginia, December 31, 1959
- Petersburg Savings & American Trust Co., December 30, 1961
- Augusta National Bank, Staunton, September 29, 1962
- First National Bank, Newport News, November 1, 1962
- Peoples National Bank & Trust Co., Lynchburg, January 31, 1963
- First National Bank, Waynesboro, July 31, 1964
- Loudoun National Bank, Leesburg, September 1, 1965
- Bank of Virginia Beach, January 1, 1966
- Bank of Chesapeake, January 31, 1966
- Suburban National Bank of Virginia, McLean, August 1, 1970
- First National Bank, Danville, June 30, 1979
- Services National Bank, Arlington, November 30, 1979
- The Bank of Chatham, October 1980
- The National Bank of Fairfax, June 30, 1981

=== Virginia National Bank ===
Norfolk National Bank was organized in 1885 and became "not only the leading bank of Norfolk, but probably the leading bank of Virginia, having recently increased its capital to one million dollars, with a surplus of half a million." Norfolk National Bank, Trust Company of Norfolk (1895) and National Bank of Commerce (1867) joined to become Norfolk National Bank of Commerce & Trusts, which joined with Virginia National Bank of Norfolk to become National Bank of Commerce of Norfolk October 9, 1933.

People's National Bank was organized in 1903 in Roanoke.

In 1920, Church Street Bank at Church and Freemason streets in Norfolk became American Exchange Bank, whose deposits were taken over in 1924 by Virginia National Bank.

In 1962, a merger with two Southampton County banks formed Tidewater Bank and Trust Co., which was then acquired by Virginia National Bank.

Virginia National Bank's 24-story Norfolk headquarters opened in January 1968.

Richmond's Virginia Trust Company could be chartered only after special legislation, since trust companies were new in the south and not all banks could have trust departments.

The Virginia Trust Company building, also designed by Bossom, opened May 31, 1921, was an example of Neoclassical architecture, using granite, marble, bronze and mahogany, with a "gilded, coffered ceiling" and "a facade patterned directly after a Roman triumphal arch."

Virginia Trust Company merged with Virginia National Bank in 1973.

Banks which merged with what became Virginia National Bankshares:

- Merchants & Planters Bank, Norfolk, November 4, 1957
- People's National Bank of Central Virginia, Charlottesville, April 26, 1963
- National Bank of Suffolk, August 23, 1963
- Farmers Exchange Bank of Abingdon, September 13, 1963
- Farmers & Merchants Bank, Staunton and Tidewater Bank & Trust, Franklin, December 13, 1963
- First National Bank of Buena Vista and Southern Bank of Commerce, Danville, April 3, 1964
- Bank of Glade Spring, January 29, 1965
- People's National Bank of Farmville and First National Bank of Gate City, April 8, 1965
- Merchants National Bank and Bank of Phoebus, Hampton, November 5, 1965
- Peoples National Bank, Victoria and Wythe County National Bank, Wytheville, April 11, 1966
- Pulaski National Bank and Bank of Crewe, August 26, 1966
- Farmers & Merchants Bank, Lawrenceville, National Bank of Woodstock, June 29, 1968
- Northampton County Trust Bank, Cape Charles, November 15, 1968
- Commonwealth National Bank, Arlington, August 15, 1969
- First National Bank, Quantico, December 19, 1969
- First National Bank, Harrisonburg, March 15, 1970
- Merchants & Farmers Bank, Smithfield, June 1, 1970
- Carroll County Bank, Hillsville, November 23, 1970
- First National Bank, Troutville, 1981
- Farmers Exchange Bank, Coeburn, 1981
- Old Colony Bank & Trust, Williamsburg
- South Boston Bank & Trust Co., 1982
- First State Bank of Wise, 1982
- Northern Virginia Bank of Springfield, 1982
- First City Bank, Newport News, 1982
- Citizens National Bank, Fries, 1982
- Farmers Bank, Mathews, 1982

=== Growth of Sovran Bank ===
In 1985, Sovran acquired Suburban Bancorp, the fourth-largest bank in Maryland with $3.1 billion in assets, in a $405 million transaction. It was founded as Silver Spring National Bank, the first bank in Silver Spring, Maryland, in 1910, and moved in 1925 when the Baltimore and Ohio Railroad underpass was built. The name changed to Suburban National Bank in 1938 when the bank took over Takoma Park Bank.

In 1986, Sovran acquired D.C. National Bancorp, based in Bethesda, Maryland, for $64.5 million in stock. At that time, Sovran had assets of $8.3 billion and D.C. National had assets of $348.2 million.

In 1987, Sovran expanded to Kentucky and Tennessee by acquiring Commerce Union, the fourth-largest bank in Tennessee.

In 1990, Sovran acquired Citizens & Southern National Bank after C&S had rejected a $2.4 billion hostile bid from North Carolina National Bank. The combined bank had $47 billion in assets, $34 billion in deposits and 976 branches in eight states. It was originally to be named Advantor Financial Corporation. However, it was named C&S/Sovran. The merged bank had dual headquarters in Atlanta and Norfolk.

In 1991, after suffering losses during the early 1990s recession, the bank was acquired by NCNB for $4.3 billion in stock.
