= Martin Bookspan =

American radio announcer (1926–2021)

- Bookspan in 1979
- Born: July 30, 1926; Boston, Massachusetts, U.S.
- Died: April 29, 2021 (aged 94); Aventura, Florida, U.S.
- Education: Harvard University
- Occupations: Broadcaster; Writer
- Spouse: Janet Sobel (m. 1954; died 2008)
- Children: 3

Martin Bookspan (July 30, 1926 – April 29, 2021) was an American announcer, commentator, and author. He was the announcer on the PBS series Live from Lincoln Center from its beginnings in 1976 until his retirement in 2006. For years he was also the announcer for another PBS series, Live from the Met (which eventually became The Metropolitan Opera Presents).

== Early life ==
Bookspan was born in Boston on July 30, 1926. His father worked as a dry goods salesman before going into insurance; his mother was a housewife. Both immigrated to the United States from the Pale of Settlement in the Russian Empire. His father enkindled Bookspan's interest in classical music by taking him to concerts on the weekends, where he would act as an usher. Bookspan attended a music academy in his hometown before studying German literature at Harvard University. There, he made his first broadcast on WHRB – the college's radio station – in 1944, at the age of 18. His first interview was with Aaron Copland, who publicly referred to his work on Appalachian Spring for the first time (though not by name). He graduated cum laude with a bachelor's degree in 1947.

== Career ==
Bookspan first worked for several radio stations around Greater Boston. During the 1950s, he acted as the executive director of the New England Opera Theater, before working for the Boston Symphony Orchestra as its coordinator of radio, television and recording. He then spent eleven years (1956 to 1967) at WQXR, a classical radio station in New York, where he was music director and program director.

Bookspan was the host of the NPR program Composers Forum in the early 1970s, in which he interviewed contemporary composers and played recordings of their music. He also wrote the Basic Repertoire column for Stereo Review, evaluating recordings of the standard orchestral repertoire. A decade later, he served as the new announcer for the VHS and DVD editions of conductor Arturo Toscanini's television concerts. Originally telecast on NBC between 1948 and 1952, the original announcements by Ben Grauer on the restored kinescopes were deemed sonically unsuitable for modern taste. Consequently, they were supplanted by Bookspan's announcements in hi-fi.

Bookspan inaugurated Live from Lincoln Center in 1976. He became known for his extensive knowledge of classical music. He was also noted for his ability to provide anecdotes to cover any unanticipated breaks, such as when the New York Philharmonic completed their performance around 18 minutes ahead of their apportioned airtime. In an earlier incident in 1959, he filled in a ten-minute interruption in Rudolf Serkin's performance after the pianist broke the pedal lyre.

Bookspan retired as the Live from Lincoln Center announcer in 2006 after three decades at the helm. He was succeeded by Fred Child.

In 2006, Bookstpan was inducted into the American Classical Music Hall of Fame.

== Personal life ==
Bookspan was married to Janet Sobel for 54 years until her death in 2008. An active researcher, she played a key role in the 1970s as an interviewer of classical singers, instrumentalists and conductors for the William E. Wiener Oral History Project of the American Jewish Committee. Janet and Martin Bookspan had three children: Rachel, David, and Deborah. They resided part-time in Berkshire County, and vacationed all but three summers between 1947 and 2019 in Stockbridge. He was a fan of the Boston Red Sox.

Bookspan died on April 29, 2021, at his home in Aventura, Florida. He was 94, and suffered from congestive heart failure prior to his death.
