= Fourth Financial Corporation =

- Trade name: Fourth National Bank of Wichita (1887-1986); Bank IV (1986-1995)
- Company type: Public
- Traded as: Nasdaq: FRTH
- Industry: Bank holding company
- Founded: 1887; 139 years ago as Fourth National Bank of Wichita; 1968; 58 years ago as Fourth Financial Corporation
- Founder: George C. Strong
- Defunct: 1995; 31 years ago
- Fate: Acquired by Boatmen's Bancshare
- Successor: Boatmen's Bancshares (now Bank of America)
- Headquarters: Wichita, Kansas
- Number of locations: 87 (Kansas); 56 (Oklahoma)
- Areas served: Kansas, Oklahoma
- Products: Financial services
- Number of employees: 3,500
- Subsidiaries: Bank IV Kansas, Bank IV Oklahoma

Fourth Financial Corporation was a Wichita, Kansas bank holding company that was formed in 1968, the largest and one of the oldest banks in Kansas as well as a dominant bank in Oklahoma when it was bought by Boatmen's Bancshares in 1995.

== History ==
Fourth National Bank of Wichita was founded by George C. Strong in 1887.

Since Kansas banking laws during the mid-twentieth century severely limited bank branching, a bank holding company was formed in 1968 called the Fourth Financial Corporation, which purchased other banks in a limited geographic region when it became permitted by state law. In 1982, the company began an aggressive expansion after state banking laws were relaxed allowing it to buy interest in other banks. It bought the maximum shares in five banks located in cities with more than 10,000 persons that also near colleges. With this strategy, the company became the biggest bank holding company in the state in 1986 when the company was allowed to fully take over its member banks. To show that the individual banks that the company owned shared common ownership, and to simplified marketing, the individual banks were named Bank IV followed by the location of the bank. As an example, Planters Bank & Trust Company in Salina became Bank IV Salina, N.A.

Between 1985 and 1990 the bank under Jordan L. Haines and Ron Baldwin bought 24 banks—one every 75 days topping off at one a month when it began acquiring troubled Savings and loan associations during the Savings and Loan Crisis in 1990. Among the S&L's purchased was Anchor Savings.

Just as the company was approaching the banking limits that it could control within the state of Kansas, state legislation was changed in 1990 that would permitted it to expand to other states so Fourth Financial began acquiring banks in Oklahoma under the Bank IV Oklahoma subsidiary.

In December 1991, Fourth Financial merged its 13 separate banks in the state of Kansas into one bank, Bank IV Kansas.

In August 1995, Boatmen's Bancshares announced plans to acquire Fourth Financial for $1.2 Billion in stock. The acquisition was completed in January 1986. At the time of acquisition, Fourth Financial had $7.4 billion in assets and 87 retail banking offices in Kansas, and 56 in Oklahoma, making it the largest banking company in Kansas and third largest in Oklahoma.
