= Bank of Missouri =

American bank

- Formerly: Bank of Perryville
- Company type: Commercial bank
- Founded: 7 November 1891
- Headquarters: Perryville, Missouri
- Area served: Missouri, United States
- Total assets: US$4.24 billion
- Owner: Reliable Community Bancshares

The Bank of Missouri is a community bank headquartered at Perryville, Missouri, in Perry County. It is a subsidiary of Reliable Community Bancshares, a privately held bank holding company also based in Perryville. It was established on 7 November 1891 as "Bank of Perryville", and the name was changed in July 1997.

== History ==
The Bank of Missouri was established on 7 November 1891 as "Bank of Perryville" at Perryville, Missouri, in Perry County. The bank's FDIC deposit insurance has been in effect since 1 January 1934. In July 1997, the institution changed its name to Bank of Missouri. The bank acquired Countryside Bank in July 2008, Security Bank and Trust Company in December 2012 and Bank Star of the BootHeel in December 2015. In October 2017, the Federal Reserve Board approved the application by Reliable Community Bancshares and MAB Acquisition Corporation to acquire Mid America Banking Corporation of Rolla, Missouri, and its subsidiary, Mid America Bank & Trust Company of Dixon, Missouri, which were integrated with the Bank of Missouri. It took over Martinsburg Bank and Trust in February 2018 and Bank of Bolivar in August 2020.

== Organisation ==
The bank is headquartered in Perryville, Missouri, and has shifted its headquarters several times within the city over the 20th century. It is classified as a commercial bank under the supervision of the Federal Deposit Insurance Corporation, holding FDIC Certificate No. 1617. The bank operates as a subsidiary of Reliable Community Bancshares.

As of 2026, the bank operated 29 branches in Missouri. It does not operate outside of the state. As per the filing done by the bank, it had approximately US$4.24 billion in assets including US$3.61 billion in deposits.
