= Montgomery Securities =

American investment bank

- Type: Investment bank
- Predecessor: Robertson, Colman, Siebel & Weisel
- Founded: 1978
- Founder: Thom Weisel
- Defunct: 1997
- Fate: Acquired by NationsBank (predecessor of Bank of America
- Successor: Banc of America Securities
- Headquarters: San Francisco, California

Montgomery Securities is an investment bank based in San Francisco, California, that specialized in high technology and health care sectors. The firm was founded in 1978 by Thom Weisel.

The bank was acquired by NationsBank Corporation on June 30, 1997. It competed in the same geographic region and market sectors as Robertson Stephens (acquired by BankAmerica Corporation) and Hambrecht & Quist (now part of JPMorganChase).

The merger of BankAmerica Corporation and NationsBank Corporation, prompted NationsBank CEO Hugh McColl to propose to put together the two investment banks, BancAmerica Robertson Stephens and NationsBanc Montgomery Securities.

Ultimately the combination did not happen as Robertson Stephens was sold off in 1998 to FleetBoston. Though, FleetBoston was later acquired by Bank of America in 2004, Robertson Stephens was closed in 2002.

Montgomery Securities is the predecessor of Banc of America Securities.

== See also ==
- Banc of America Securities
