= South Carolina Pacific Railway =

South Carolina shortline railroad

The South Carolina Pacific Railway was a shortline railroad operation that existed in eastern South Carolina in the late 19th century and much of the 20th century.

The line was chartered in 1882 and completed in 1884. It ran 10.5 miles from Bennettsville, South Carolina, east to the border with North Carolina.

It was leased to the Cape Fear and Yadkin Valley Railway Company beginning in 1884.

In January 1885, a 30-year lease went into effect in which the Cape Fear and Yadkin Valley paid $12,000 annually, covered the interest on bonds taken out by the South Carolina Pacific (nearly $6,300 a year) and agreed to pay for maintenance of the line. At this point, the board of the South Carolina Pacific resigned, as agreed, and the Cape Fear and Yadkin Valley's directors took over.

The Cape Fear and Yadkin Valley were placed in receivership in 1894 and the South Carolina Pacific was first sold for $1 million, then, two weeks later, it was resold for $5 million.

For three decades ownership of the Cape Fear and Yadkin Valley changed hands repeatedly, until a North Carolina Supreme Court decision in 1924. The southern routes of the Cape Fear and Yadkin Valley, including the South Carolina Pacific, went to the Atlantic Coast Line Railroad.

The lease for the South Carolina Pacific passed to the Atlantic Coast Line. In 1914, the Atlantic Coast Line renewed its lease with the South Carolina Pacific for 99 years, beginning on Jan. 1, 1915. However, the company was merged into the Seaboard System in 1983 and the South Carolina Pacific was officially dissolved.

Although the company itself existed for just over 100 years, it appears the only item it owned was official company correspondence.
