= First Republic Bank Corporation =

Former bank

- Industry: Banking
- Founded: 1920; 106 years ago (as Guaranty Bank and Trust Company)
- Founder: Eugene DeBogory
- Headquarters: Dallas, Texas, United States

First Republic Bank Corporation was an American bank based in Texas. Founded as the Guaranty Bank and Trust Company in 1920, in 1922 it assumed the name Republic National Bank of Dallas. Afterwards the bank acquired several banks and invested in others, and changed its name several times. By 1948 Republic had grown to become the largest bank in Texas. The bank failed in 1988, during the savings and loan crisis. It was acquired by NCNB Corporation in 1988. As a result of a series of mergers over the next two decades, most of what was once First Republic is now part of Bank of America.

== History ==
The company first opened as the Guaranty Bank and Trust Company in 1920, founded by a University of Texas law school alumnus named Eugene DeBogory. In 1922 when Guaranty obtained a national charter it assumed the name Republic National Bank of Dallas.

When the company began servicing farm and ranch loans, it was required to establish a Texas subsidiary, Republic Trust and Savings Bank, to comply with regulations governing national banks at the time. In 1928 the regulations changed, allowing the state-chartered Republic Trust and Savings Bank to be merged back into the parent company, forming the Republic National Bank and Trust Company.

During the next decade Republic acquired North Texas National Bank, and invested in several other Texas banks during the banking crisis of 1933. In 1938 the name changed again back to Republic National Bank of Dallas. By 1948 Republic had grown to become the largest bank in Texas. In the 1970s, toward the tail end of a lengthy period of expansion and acquisition, Republic acquired the Houston National Bank and held a substantial portfolio of loans to the real estate industry in Texas.

In the late 1980s Savings and Loan crisis, Texas in general and Republic's loan portfolio in particular were hit hard by real estate devaluation. In efforts to remain solvent, RepublicBank Corporation in 1987 merged with InterFirst Bank Corporation, also based in Dallas, creating First RepublicBank Corporation. However, First Republic was unable to weather the downturn. In March, the FDIC pumped $1 billion into First Republic and sought a buyer for the ailing bank. While Citicorp and Wells Fargo put in bids, the FDIC ultimately accepted a less costly bid from a far smaller bank from Charlotte, North Carolina, NCNB Corporation. First Republic failed on July 29, 1988; later that day, the FDIC awarded the remains of First Republic to NCNB. The deal doubled NCNB's assets and vaulted it from the 17th-largest bank in the country to the 10th-largest in one stroke.

== See also ==
- Bank of America Plaza (Dallas)
- List of companies in the Dallas–Fort Worth metroplex
- List of banks
