= Citizens & Southern National Bank =

Bank in the southern United States

Citizens and Southern National Bank (C&S) was an American bank which started as a Georgia institution that expanded into South Carolina, Florida and into other states via mergers. Headquartered in Atlanta, Georgia; it was the largest bank in the Southeast for much of the 20th century. C&S merged with Sovran Bank in 1990 to form C&S/Sovran in hopes of fending off a hostile takeover attempt by NCNB Corporation. Only a year later, however, C&S/Sovran merged with NCNB to form NationsBank, which forms the core of today's Bank of America.

A former Charleston, South Carolina, location, Citizens and Southern National Bank of South Carolina, is the second-oldest bank building in the U.S. and possibly the oldest still used as a bank. Constructed in 1798 as the Bank of South Carolina it later became the home for the Charleston Library Society (1835), then belonged to the Charleston Chamber of Commerce (1914), and finally became a bank again when C&S purchased the two-story building in 1966. Located at 50 Broad Street, it is now a private office building.

== History ==
Logo of the Citizens & Southern National Banks of Georgia, used prior to the NationsBank merger

Logo of the Citizens & Southern National Bank of South Carolina, used prior to the NationsBank merger

The bank began in Georgia with the merger of the Citizens Bank of Savannah (established November 2, 1887) and its crosstown rival, the Southern Bank of Georgia in 1906. Mills B. Lane had begun at Citizens Bank as a vice president and director in 1891. In 1901, Lane became president of Citizens Bank. In 1906, Lane and his associates purchased Southern Bank of Georgia enabling them to merge the two banks as the new C&S Bank. The newly merged banks were officially named the Citizens and Southern Bank of Georgia.

In 1922 Citizens and Southern absorbed Central Bank and Trust Corp., the bank founded by Coca-Cola co-founder Asa Griggs Candler.

In preparation to open offices in South Carolina, Citizens and Southern Bank received its charter from the Comptroller of the Currency on May 2, 1927. The "place where its operations ... are to be carried on", is described in that charter as the "City of Savannah, in the County of Chatham and State of Georgia." Mills Lane Jr. and Hugh C. Lane were important figures in the growth and success of C&S. Mills Lane Jr., serving as president, vice chairman and chairman between 1946 and 1973, made C&S the South's largest bank as well as the most profitable of the 50 largest U.S. banks. Hugh C. Lane was elected chairman of C&S in 1960.

In South Carolina, parties associated with C&S of Georgia purchased all the stock of Charleston-based Atlantic Savings Bank and Atlantic National Bank. Atlantic Savings Bank, renamed in 1918, opened October 1, 1874, as the Germania Savings Bank. In May 1928, the names of the two Atlantic banks were changed to Citizens and Southern Bank of South Carolina, although the bank was operating only in Charleston with two locations on King Street and was owned by C&S of Georgia.

=== Split, growth, and reunification ===
Quick growth ensued in both South Carolina and Georgia. In 1940, preparing for new federal rules that prohibited banks from operating in multiple states, C&S of South Carolina became a separate corporate entity from C&S of Georgia, allowing South Carolina to have a large "local" bank. In 1956, C&S of South Carolina merged with Growers Bank and Trust in Inman, South Carolina In 1960, C&S of South Carolina installed computers which improved efficiency allowing accountholders with $100 minimum balance per month to have free checking, a first in South Carolina.

In 1985, the Citizens and Southern Georgia Corporation agreed to acquire Citizens and Southern National Bank of South Carolina for $400m or $55/share, reuniting (in 1986) the two banks which had been separated in 1940. At the time the two C&S banks reunited, C&S of South Carolina had assets of $2.5 billion while C&S of Georgia's assets were $12.3 billion.

C&S of Georgia also acquired Landmark Banks of Florida in 1985. The Landmark Bank became The Citizens & Southern National Bank of Florida. C&S of Georgia doubled its size in eighteen months as a result of the acquisition of Landmark Banks and C&S of South Carolina.

C&S had several affiliated companies including the C&S Corporation, the C&S Realty Corporation, the C&S Computer Services Corporation, and the C&S Housing Corporation.

=== "Distressed" due to mergers ===
From 1984 to 1986, the Southeastern Regional Banking Compact allowed Southern banks with primarily Southern deposits to acquire or be acquired by each other while keeping the feared New York, Chicago, and West Coast banks out. This led several of the stronger Southern banks to begin buying regional competitors in order to make them too rich to be taken over.

Sovran Bank, soon to be purchased by C&S, acquired D.C. National Bancorp in 1986, then Commerce Union Bank in 1987.

=== Mergers ===
==== Sovran Financial Corp. ====
In 1988, C&S initiated merger talks with First Federal Savings Bank in Brunswick Ga. However, First Federal rejected the deal claiming C&S's offer was insufficient and C&S ended the talks. Later, First Federal unsuccessfully sued C&S/Sovran to block NCNB's merger with C&S/Sovran.

Shortly afterward, NCNB, which had grown from a one-state bank into a regional powerhouse, announced plans for a hostile takeover of C&S, and started buying up large blocks of C&S stock. Partly to fend off further takeover attempts, C&S acquired Sovran Financial Corporation of Norfolk, Virginia. The merged company took the name C&S/Sovran, with dual headquarters in Atlanta and Norfolk. The merger created a $47 billion bank with branches in Florida, Georgia, South Carolina, Virginia, Tennessee, Kentucky and the District of Columbia. It appeared to be an enormous Southern super-regional bank rich enough to resist takeover attempts by other banks.

==== NationsBank ====
The hasty merger of C&S and Sovran Financial was intended to create a strong, dominant regional bank. However, two problems soon emerged that made C&S/Sovran a takeover target. First was infighting between executives of the two newly combined banks with an Atlanta faction (C&S) and a Virginia faction (Sovran). Second, Sovran had a portfolio of problem loans which weakened the newly merged banks.

NCNB, which had been busy expanding by taking over distressed banks like Texas' First Republic Bank Corporation, quickly recognized that C&S/Sovran was also "distressed". The NCNB purchase of First Republic almost doubled NCNB's assets which helped it to acquire the weakened C&S/Sovran in 1991. C&S/Sovran had $49 billion in assets compared to NCNB's $69 billion in assets upon merger. The merged company took the name NationsBank, headquartered in NCNB's old hometown of Charlotte.

Before the NCNB/C&S/Sovran merger, NCNB was ranked 10th in the US in terms of assets while C&S/Sovran was ranked 12th. Following the merger, NationsBank was ranked 3rd.

C&S/Sovran merged into NCNB as a stock swap transaction and was valued at $4.259 billion. NCNB issued .84 of its shares for each C&S/Sovran shares. Based on NCNB's closing stock price of $37 on July 19, 1991, the last full trading day prior to the announcement, each share of C&S/Sovran was valued at $31.08.

As part of the merger, some C&S branches were sold to other banks. The Moncks Corner (SC) C&S was sold to First National Bank, C&S in Marion, Barnwell, Chester, St. George, Darlington, and Williston, SC, were sold to First Citizens Bank. NCNB of South Carolina also sold some branches to other South Carolina banks. NCNB's Hilton Head, SC, branch went to First Union of NC.

NationsBank continued to expand, eventually buying BankAmerica Corp. which had previously merged with Security Pacific National Bank of Los Angeles, another large California bank. Although NationsBank was the surviving company, it adopted the better-known Bank of America marque, replacing the old BankAmerica eagle logo with a new stylized logo based on the U.S. flag.

== Headquarters buildings ==
C&S had two headquarters buildings in Atlanta, following its expansion out of Savannah. The first building is still standing and is today the Georgia State University J. Mack Robinson College of Business Administration Building. It was built in 1901, and has 14 floors. It was the first steel framed building to be built in Atlanta. It was known as the Empire Building from 1901 to 1920, the Atlanta Trust Company Building from 1920 to 1929, and as the Citizens and Southern National Bank Building from 1929 to 1992. This building was given as a gift to GSU in 1992 following the acquisition of C&S by NCNB. J. Mack Robinson was a director and large stockholder of NCNB rival, Wachovia Bank.

In 1968, C&S moved its headquarters to the newly built C&S Bank Tower (built 1964–1968) which was designed by Richard Aeck (1912–1996). A unique building for that time in Atlanta, it echoed Frank Lloyd Wright's design used in the Johnson Wax Research Tower (1944).

The Aeck C&S Bank Tower building was dismantled piece by piece after the NationsBank Plaza building opened in June 1992.

Construction of a new, much larger headquarters building in Atlanta began in 1991, shortly before C&S merged with Sovran. The new building would never be a headquarters for C&S, as NCNB bought it while construction was underway. It opened as NationsBank Plaza in 1992, and then renamed to Bank of America Plaza in 1998 after the NationsBank/BankAmerica merger and NationsBank rebranded as Bank of America.
