= North Carolina National Bank =

American bank, 1957–1998

- Final logo, used from 1973
- Formerly: American Commercial Bank
- Type: Public
- Industry: Financial services
- Predecessor: American Trust Company and Commercial National Bank
- Founded: 1957; 69 years ago
- Defunct: 1998
- Fate: Merged with C&S/Sovran
- Successor: NationsBank (now Bank of America)
- Headquarters: Charlotte, North Carolina, United States
- Key people: Tom Storrs Chairman & CEO (1974-1983); Hugh McColl Chairman & CEO (1983-1991)
- Products: Banking services

North Carolina National Bank (NCNB) was an American bank based in Charlotte, North Carolina, prior to 1960 called American Commercial Bank. It was one of America's top banking institutions between the 1960s-1990s. From 1974 to 1983, the bank was run by chairman and chief executive officer Tom Storrs. What was NCNB forms the core of today's Bank of America.

== History ==
In 1957 American Trust Co. (founded 1901) and Commercial National Bank (founded 1876) merged to form American Commercial Bank in Charlotte, North Carolina. In 1960 American Commercial Bank merged with Greensboro-based Security National Bank to form North Carolina National Bank. While American Commercial was the nominal survivor, the merged bank gave up American Commercial's state charter to operate under the Greensboro bank's national charter. In 1969, it reorganized as a holding company, NCNB Corporation.

In 1983, Ellis Bank of Florida merged with NCNB and then, in 1986, NCNB announced plans for an 875-foot signature skyscraper in downtown Charlotte that would serve as its corporate headquarters. In 1991, while construction was underway, NCNB acquired C&S/Sovran Corp. of Atlanta and Norfolk and took the new name, NationsBank. The new skyscraper opened in 1992 as NationsBank Corporate Center.

In 1998 NationsBank acquired BankAmerica Corp. and took the name Bank of America which now operates in all 50 states. The transaction was run by Hugh McColl. Bank of America retains NCNB/NationsBank's pre-1998 stock price history, and is headquartered at what is now Bank of America Corporate Center.

The former North Carolina National Bank Building in Burlington, North Carolina, was added to the National Register of Historic Places in 1984.
