= Silicon Valley Community Foundation =

Donor-advised community foundation

- Silicon Valley Community Foundation
- Formation: January 3, 2007; 19 years ago
- Type: Donor-advised fund, charitable organization
- Headquarters: Mountain View, California
- Region served: Santa Clara County and San Francisco Peninsula
- Key people: President & CEO; Nicole Taylor; Chair of the Board; Greta S. Hansen
- Revenue: $1.4 billion (2017)
- Disbursements: $1.3 billion (2017)
- Endowment: $13.5 billion (2017)
- Website: Official website

The Silicon Valley Community Foundation (SVCF) is a donor-advised community foundation in Silicon Valley. It is the largest charitable foundation in Silicon Valley.

== History ==
=== Early history: 2006–2011 ===
Silicon Valley Community Foundation was formed on July 12, 2006, through the merger of two community foundations in the San Francisco Bay Area: the Peninsula Community Foundation (headquartered in San Mateo, California) and Community Foundation Silicon Valley (headquartered in San Jose, California). Silicon Valley Community Foundation launched officially on January 3, 2007 (headquartered in Mountain View, CA.

In September 2008, Silicon Valley Community Foundation announced five key grantmaking strategies: Economic Security, Education, Immigrant Integration, Regional Planning and a Community Opportunity Fund to address time-sensitive community needs including safety-net services (2008–2013).

=== 2012 ===
On December 18, 2012, Facebook founder and CEO Mark Zuckerberg and his wife Priscilla Chan announced a donation of 18 million Facebook shares to the Silicon Valley Community Foundation, which at the time of the donation were worth a total of about $500 million.

Silicon Valley Community Foundation raised a total of $985 million in 2012. Assets under management grew to about $2.9 billion, and the foundation awarded a total of $292 million in grants in the year 2012.

In December 2012, SVCF helped relaunch Caltrain's Holiday Train, a nine-year tradition was brought back after a two-year hiatus.

=== 2013 ===
On December 19, 2013, Zuckerberg announced a donation of 18 million Facebook shares to the Silicon Valley Community Foundation, to be executed by the end of the month, totaling $990 million. On December 31, 2013, the donation was recognized as the largest charitable gift on public record for 2013.

=== 2014 ===
In 2014, Jan Koum, founder of WhatsApp donated close to $556 million to the Silicon Valley Community Foundation to set up a donor-advised fund.

Silicon Valley Community Foundation created and hosted Silicon Valley Gives, the Bay Area's first 24-hour giving day, on May 6, 2014. The event was sponsored by John S. and James L. Knight Foundation, Microsoft, NBC Bay Area, and more than 100 other individuals, foundations, and companies. The event raised $8,000,833 with 14,889 unique donors and more than 21,869 donations. SVCF also hosted more than 20 trainings for more than 650 local nonprofits to help them capacity build leading up to the event.

On October 2, 2014, Nicholas and Jill Woodman, founders of GoPro, announced that they would donate $500 million to Silicon Valley Community Foundation.

October 23, 2014, Paul Allen announced that he would open a fund for Tackle Ebola with Silicon Valley Community Foundation.

=== 2018 ===
In April 2018, the foundation hired a law firm to investigate the claims made by Mari Ellen Loijens describing sexual harassment over the course of many years. A few days later, the CEO, Emmett Carson, was placed on paid leave. Two months later, the CEO's employment "ended" and the resignation of the head of H.R. was accepted, as an investigation "found that many allegations from current and former employees were substantiated".

In November 2018, the board of directors of the foundation named Nicole Taylor as president and CEO.

=== 2024 ===
Netflix co-founder and executive chairman Reed Hastings gifted two million of his company shares worth $1.1 billion to the foundation in January 2024.

== Taxation ==
SVCF is a 501(c)(3) organization that publishes annual reports of its financial transactions and grantmaking.

As a donor-advised fund sponsor, the IRS allows donors to claim a tax benefit immediately upon donating the assets to the donor advised fund, but may defer when the assets are distributed as grants to charities. The fund is not legally required to distribute any assets, like family foundations are, so there is little pressure to move money.

The timing of prominent donations to the foundation has led to accusations of the foundation being used as a tax loophole. Both Mark Zuckerberg and Nick Woodman donated near the same time as their companies' IPOs, and the founders of WhatsApp donated shortly after their company's acquisition.

== See also ==
- Silicon Valley Education Foundation
