= Dean Woodman =

American businessman (1928–2019)

- Born: November 4, 1928; Chicago, Illinois
- Died: December 19, 2019 (aged 91); Sausalito, California
- Education: Amherst College
- Occupation: Businessman
- Known for: Founding partner of Robertson Stephens
- Spouse(s): Lavonne Newell (divorced), Concepcion Socarras (divorced); Jane Woodman
- Children: 4

Dean Woodman (November 4, 1928 – December 19, 2019) was an American businessman, philanthropist, and co-founder of the investment bank Robertson Stephens.

== Biography ==
Woodman was born in 1928 to a Quaker family. In 1946, he graduated from the Moses Brown School and then Amherst College where he studied economics. After college, he served in the United States Naval Air Corps. In 1955, he worked in the investment banking division of Merrill Lynch including 16 years as director of West Coast corporate financing. In 1978, he co-founded investment bank Robertson Colman Stephens & Woodman and in 1982, he co-founded the investment bank Woodman, Kirkpatrick & Gilbreath where he brokered Pepsi's purchase of Taco Bell.

In 1984, Woodman served as managing director in the investment banking group of Hambrecht & Quist and in 1988, he served as managing director of the international investment bank ING Barings LLC (and its predecessor Furman Selz). In 1999, he left ING to work as a consultant specializing in financial assignments, private equity and debt placements, and mergers and acquisitions. He is also a director of Medallion Bank, a wholly owned subsidiary of Medallion Financial Corp. In 2002, he provided a $200,000 loan to his son, Nick Woodman, as seed money to found the sports camera company, GoPro. As of May 2014, he owned 6.4% of GoPro stock.

== Philanthropy ==
In 2013, he donated $5 million to his alma mater, Moses Brown School to build a community and performing arts center at the school. He made the gift in honor of his Quaker family's five-generation commitment to the school where his great-grandfather Augustine Jones served as a headmaster.

== Personal life ==
Woodman's first marriage was to Lavonne Newell, with whom he had one son, Curtis Woodman. Woodman's second marriage was to Concepcion Socarras with whom he had three children including Nick Woodman, the founder of GoPro. In 1992, Concepcion remarried Irwin Federman, General Partner of U.S. Venture Partners. He was remarried to Jane Woodman.
