= Irwin Federman =

American businessman

- Born: 1936 (age 89–90)
- Education: B.S. Brooklyn College
- Occupation: Businessman
- Known for: President of Monolithic Memories; General Partner of U.S. Venture Partners
- Spouse(s): Shiela Federman (until death); Concepcion Socarras
- Children: Four with Shiela Federman (Alex Federman, Carolyn Federman, Eric Federman and Jamie Greenberg); three step-children with Socarras including Nick Woodman

Irwin Federman (born 1936) is an American businessman, philanthropist and General Partner of U.S. Venture Partners.

== Biography ==
Federman was born to a Jewish family in 1936 and graduated with a B.S. in Economics from Brooklyn College. After college, he was awarded the Forbes Gold Medal for attaining the highest grade in California on his CPA exam and then worked as an accountant in New York and California. He then went on to serve as CFO of three startup companies the last of which was the troubled semiconductor manufacturer Monolithic Memories (MMI). Irwin was appointed MMI's President, the first non-engineer CEO in the semiconductor industry, and he presided over its successful turn around. Instead of laying workers off, he required that all workers to take one unpaid day off every other week, effectively cutting the payroll by 10% but preserving everyone's job: the policy actually boosted morale as workers bonded over the shared sacrifice; managers came into work on their off days; and everyone was more careful with their expenses. In 1980, MMI went public. In 1987, in a $442 million stock swap, MMI was merged with Advanced Micro Devices to become the world's largest integrated circuit manufacturer. Federman was appointed Vice Chairman of AMD. In 1988, he served as Managing Director of investment banking firm Dillon, Read & Co. In 1990, he joined early-stage venture capital firm, U.S. Venture Partners, where he served as General Partner. He previously served on the Boards of Directors of SanDisk, Checkpoint Software Technologies and Mellanox, Inc.

== Philanthropy and awards ==
Federman served two terms as Chairman of the U.S. Semiconductor Industry Association; he served on the board of directors of the National Venture Capital Association, and served two terms on the Dean's advisory board of the Leavey School of Business at Santa Clara Federman received Torch of Liberty Award from the Anti-Defamation League and the Brotherhood Award from the Silicon Valley Conference for Community and Justice. In 2004, Federman was inducted into Junior Achievement's Silicon Valley Hall of Fame. In 2008, he received the International Business Forum's Special Achievement Award. He serves as a trustee of San Francisco Ballet, Brooklyn College, and the San Francisco Museum of Modern Art. He was also awarded an Honorary Doctorate of Engineering Science from Santa Clara University and the Exemplary Community Leadership Award from the Silicon Valley Conference of Christians and Jews (now FACES).

== Personal life ==
His first wife was Sheila Federman with whom he had four children; she died in 1987. In 1992, he remarried to Concepcion Socarras, the former wife of Dean Woodman and mother of three children including Nick Woodman, the founder of GoPro.
