= EducationSuperHighway =

Nonprofit organization in San Francisco, United States

- Founded: 2012
- Founder: Evan Marwell (CEO)
- Type: Nonprofit organization
- Purpose: Connecting classrooms to high-speed broadband
- Headquarters: San Francisco, California
- Services: Consulting, software
- Website: educationsuperhighway.org

EducationSuperHighway is a United States nonprofit organization founded in 2012 by Evan Marwell to address the lack of high-speed internet access in U.S. public school classrooms. The organization received funding from initiatives backed by Mark Zuckerberg and Priscilla Chan, as well as the Gates Foundation.

In 2019, EducationSuperHighway announced it had effectively closed the classroom connectivity gap, with over 99% of U.S. schools meeting minimum broadband standards. The organization sunset its operations in 2020 after launching tools to support continued progress.

== History ==
EducationSuperHighway was founded in 2012 and provided research, advocacy, and consulting services to states and school districts, with the goal of ensuring connectivity at the FCC-recommended minimum speeds.

In 2013, EducationSuperHighway raised $9 million in funding led by Mark Zuckerberg's Startup:Education fund, with additional funding coming from the Gates Foundation. The organization has published a yearly State of the States report that compiles data from the FCC's E-Rate program and helps to connect schools with the funding offered by ERate.

In 2015, the organization raised an additional $20 million from Zuckerberg and his wife Priscilla Chan. That same year, EducationSuperHighway's founder and CEO was recognized by the San Francisco Chronicle as Visionary of the Year for the organization's work.

In 2019, EducationSuperHighway released its 2019 State of the States report, reporting that it had completed its mission to close the classroom connectivity gap, with 99.3% of the nation’s schools now having affordable and reliable broadband connections at a minimum speed of 100 kbps and with a path to scaling bandwidth for future needs. In January 2020, EducationSuperHighway reported that had created a new tool (ConnectK12) to provide the broadband data and pricing information that school district and state leaders need to upgrade their bandwidth to the FCC’s 1 Mbps per student goal. It selected Connected Nation and Funds For Learning to launch and maintain the tool, announcing EducationSuperHighway would sunset on August 31, 2020.
