= Mathematics, Engineering, Science Achievement =

Academic pre-college preparation program

MESA
- Headquarters: Oakland
- Website: mesa.ucop.edu

Mathematics, Engineering, Science Achievement (MESA) is an academic preparation program for pre-college, community college and university-level students. Established in 1970 in California, the program provides academic support to students from educationally disadvantaged backgrounds throughout the education pathway so they will excel in math and science and ultimately attain four-year degrees in science, technology, engineering or math (STEM) fields. The program has successfully been replicated in over a dozen other states.

== Locations and partners ==
MESA, while administered by the University of California, is an intersegmental program, with centers located at all major statewide education institutions (California Department of Education, University of California, California State University, California Community Colleges, the Association of Independent California Colleges and Universities). MESA has established an active partnership with industry and STEM leaders such as AT&T, Chevron, Google, HP, Sempra Energy, and PG&E. These partners supply expertise, volunteers, internship and opportunities for students to visit companies and learn about career options in STEM fields. The strong relationship with industry has resulted in MESA incorporating many elements of industry culture into its approaches and activities.

A partnership of MESA programs in eleven states (Arizona, California, Colorado, Maryland, New Mexico, Nevada, Oregon, Utah and Washington) has established a network called MESA USA.

== Program components ==
The MESA School Program (MSP) supports pre-college students (mostly in middle and senior high schools) to excel in math and science and go on to college as majors in STEM fields. Advising and academic assistance is provided through a MESA advisor, usually a math or science teacher. Components of the MSP include development of individual academic plans to ensure timely completion of college preparatory classes, study skills training, local and regional competitions in hands-on activities, career and college exploration, and parent leadership development. MSP also offers professional development opportunities for math and science teachers to learn innovative approaches and hands-on activities that can be replicated in schools with limited resources.

The MESA Community College Program (MCCP) provides academic preparation for community college students who are interested in transferring to four-year institutions to attain baccalaureate degrees in STEM fields. MESA establishes an on-campus peer community to reinforce and support academic achievement while providing academic assistance and transfer guidance. Components of the MCCP include Academic Excellence Workshops that teach collaborative learning techniques that help students to master complex concepts; a special orientation course for STEM students; a dedicated study center; career advising and exploration of STEM options; transfer assistance; scholarships, and links with student and professional organizations.

The MESA Engineering Program (MEP) supports students at four-year institutions so they will successfully attain baccalaureate degrees in engineering or computer science. The MEP emphasizes rigorous academics, leadership preparation, and collaborative problem-solving training so its graduates will meet industry’s technology workforce needs. Similar to the MCCP, the MEP establishes a peer community that provides students, most of whom are first in their family to go to college, with mutual support and encouragement so they will succeed academically. Components of the MEP include Academic Excellence Workshops, orientation classes, tutoring, a study center and computer lab, career advising, exploration of career options in STEM fields, scholarships, internships, and links with student and professional organizations.

== Awards ==
=== Awarded by MESA ===
MESA annually awards the Mentor of the Year award.

=== Received ===
MESA has been named among the top five most innovative public programs in the nation by Innovations in American Government, an initiative of the Ford Foundation, the Kennedy School of Government at Harvard University, and the Council for Excellence in Government. MESA is also a past winner of the Presidential Award for Excellence in Science, Mathematics, and Engineering Mentoring.

The Silicon Valley Education Foundation named MESA its 2013 STEM Innovation awardee in math. MESA was named by Bayer Corporation as one of 21 exemplary programs proven to help K-12 students, especially minorities and girls, to participate and succeed in STEM fields. MESA has served as a model for Hewlett-Packard for its Diversity in Engineering Program, a national grant initiative to academically prepare more underrepresented minority students at community colleges so they could successfully transfer to four-year institutions as engineering and computer science majors. In 2008 MESA was named a finalist by Excelencia in Education as one of the nation's most effective community college programs to increase educational opportunities and improve achievement for Latino students.

== Notable alumni ==
Victor Glover: is a NASA astronaut of the class of 2013 and Pilot on the first operational flight of the SpaceX Crew Dragon to the International Space Station.

Jose Hernandez: is a former NASA astronaut and American engineer.

== See also ==
- Mary Perry Smith, one of the founders of the program
