= Silicon Valley Education Foundation =

Non-profit organization

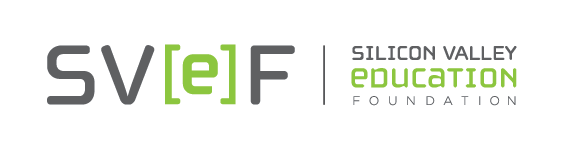
- Founded: 1998
- Type: Non-Profit Organization
- Region served: Silicon Valley
- Key people: President & CEO; Lisa Andrew; Chief Operating Officer; Chris Carney; Chief Innovation Officer; Rosemary Kamei
- Employees: 11-50
- Website: svefoundation.org

Silicon Valley Education Foundation (SVEF) is a non-profit organization serving Silicon Valley. Headquartered in San Jose, California, the SVEF creates resources and programs for students and educators in Silicon Valley in Science, technology, engineering, and mathematics (STEM) fields.

== History ==
SVEF was founded as a result of a merger of the San Jose Education Foundation and Santa Clara County Education Foundation.

== Funding ==
=== Recent financials and funding ===
SVEF's total expenditures in the 2015 fiscal year netted around $5,132,000. These funds were focused 78% on SVEF's programs, 14% on fundraising, and 8% on management.

In 2015, SVEF raised more than $1.3 million for its purpose of expanding STEM education in the Silicon Valley. This money came from various donors, including venture-capitalist John Doerr. Intel and SanDisk are also sponsors of SVEF, among other corporations such as Adobe, Oracle, Cisco, and Chevron.

=== Past funding ===
Since its launch in 1998, SVEF has received support from large foundations focused on improving education in the United States and reducing the achievement gap.

- The John S. and James L. Knight Foundation is a partner of SVEF. The Knight Foundation granted $1.7 million to partially fund the Silicon Valley STEM initiative, that would raise a total of $3 million.
- The Bill & Melinda Gates Foundation made grants of $351,493 (October 2013, for the iHub), $750,000 (October 2014), and $1,616,641 (April 2015).
- The Hewlett Foundation made grants of $470,000 (July 2009), $50,000 (November 2009), and $100,000 (July 2011).

SVEF has also previously partnered with ConvergeUS, a charity co-founded by Twitter co-founder Biz Stone.

== Initiatives and partnerships ==
SVEF has developed various resources available to school districts around Silicon Valley.

=== Elevate [Math] and [Science] ===
This program is a 75-hour, 19-day-long summer intervention program that focuses on preparing 7th, 8th, 9th, and 10th graders for more advanced math and science courses, as well as offering teachers a 35-hour course for the development of their skills, which is based on Common Core ideals.

=== iHub ===
This pilot program is a platform for entrepreneurs from Silicon Valley to propose various educational and technological products in order to improve education. The program allows students and teachers to provide feedback to the entrepreneurs. Collaborators and partners of this program include the Bill & Melinda Gates Foundation, Stanford Graduate School of Education, and several others. It is distinct from the iHub located in Kenya.

SVEF also hosts the Learning Innovation Hub (iHub) Pitch Games, in which entrepreneurs present a product or business model, and judges ask them questions and decide winners. Funding for the competition comes from grants made by the Bill & Melinda Gates Foundation.

=== 49ers STEM Leadership Institute ===
This program was established in a partnership between the San Francisco 49ers, SVEF, and the Santa Clara Unified School District. It is a 6-year-long program for grades 7-12, which offers a college-preparatory curriculum that is focused on STEM and core values. Students in the program are challenged with advanced academic classes and participate in year-long projects that allow them to develop teamwork skills. The 49ers STEM Leadership Institute was awarded the Golden Bell Award from the state of California in 2019.

=== Teacher Innovation Grants ===
Sponsors such as Wells Fargo allow SVEF to make annual grants called Teacher Innovation Grants (TIG) to teachers in Silicon Valley who apply for this grant. Individual teachers are allowed to apply for up to $1000 for class projects or field-trips, whereas 2 or more teachers are allowed to apply for up to $1500. SVEF has made nearly $800,000 worth of grants for around 1,400 teachers.

=== East Side Alliance ===
The East Side Alliance (ESA) is a partnership between 8 school districts in the state of California and Silicon Valley, which serves around 85,000 students. Partners and districts in the ESA agree to collaborate towards common goals, in order to benefit students. San Jose State University is also a member of this partnership, and students of member districts are hence given an opportunity for admission to the university by better fitting their standards.

== See also ==
- Silicon Valley Community Foundation
- Education in the United States
- Achievement gap in the United States
- Startup:Education
