= Mary Perry Smith =

American mathematics educator

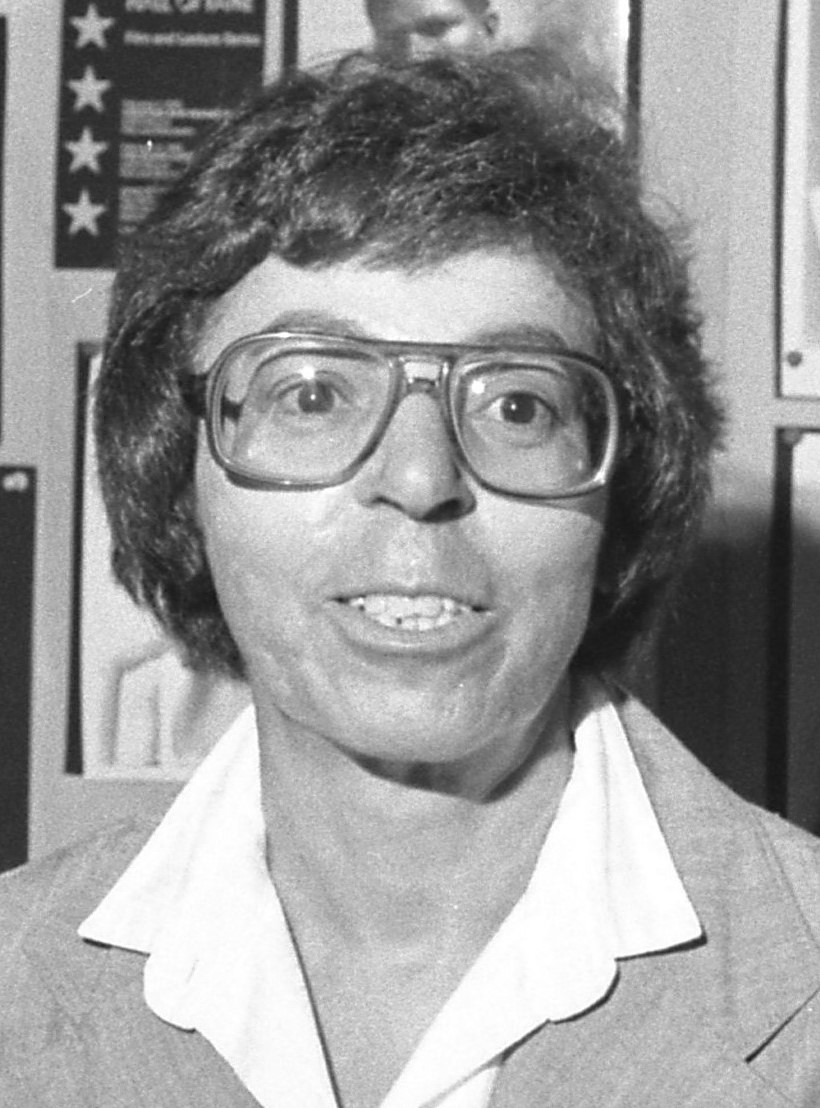
- Smith in 1983
- Born: May 29, 1926
- Died: August 10, 2015 (aged 89)
- Education: Ball State University; Purdue University
- Occupation: Mathematics educator
- Known for: Co-founded the Black Filmmakers Hall of Fame
- Spouse: Norvel L. Smith

Mary Perry Smith (May 29, 1926 – August 10, 2015) was an American mathematics educator who cofounded the Mathematics, Engineering, Science Achievement program and the Black Filmmakers Hall of Fame.

== Early life and education ==
Perry Smith was born on May 29, 1926, and was originally from Evansville, Indiana, one of six children of a minister in the African Methodist Episcopal Church; her maternal grandfather, Henry Allen Perry had been a chaplain and mathematics teacher at the Tuskegee Institute, where her parents met. As a child she moved frequently, to Kokomo, Logansport, Anderson, Crawfordsville, and Frankfort, all in Indiana. She earned a bachelor's degree from Ball State University in mathematics and science in three years, as one of a small number of African-American students there, and continued at Purdue University for a master's degree in counseling and guidance (with minors in biochemistry and statistics), finishing in 1948.

== Later life and career ==
Unable to find a job because of the discrimination in teacher hiring in Indiana, she followed her older brother to the newly opened Texas State University for Negroes in Houston, where she taught mathematics for three years.

After marrying Norvel L. Smith (later to become the president of Merritt College and the first African American head of a college in California) and moving with her husband to Oakland, California, she joined a doctoral program in educational psychology at the University of California, Berkeley, but moved to part-time study and then stopped out to become a teacher, first in a junior high school in San Francisco from 1953 until 1961, and then at Oakland Technical High School, where she taught geometry for 17 years.

== Service ==
In 1969, Perry Smith cofounded the Mathematics, Engineering, Science Achievement (MESA) program for under-privileged pre-college students in California. In 1974, she cofounded the Black Filmmakers Hall of Fame in Oakland, California, initially as part of the Oakland Museum’s Cultural and Ethnics Affairs Guild and, in 1978, as a separate organization; she also served as its president. She left her teaching position to work for the MESA program in 1977, as statewide program director, and also served on the board of the Oakland Museum of California. She died in 2015.

== Legacy ==
Her papers are kept in the Bancroft Library of the University of California, Berkeley.
