= Nick Woodman =

American businessman, founder and CEO of GoPro

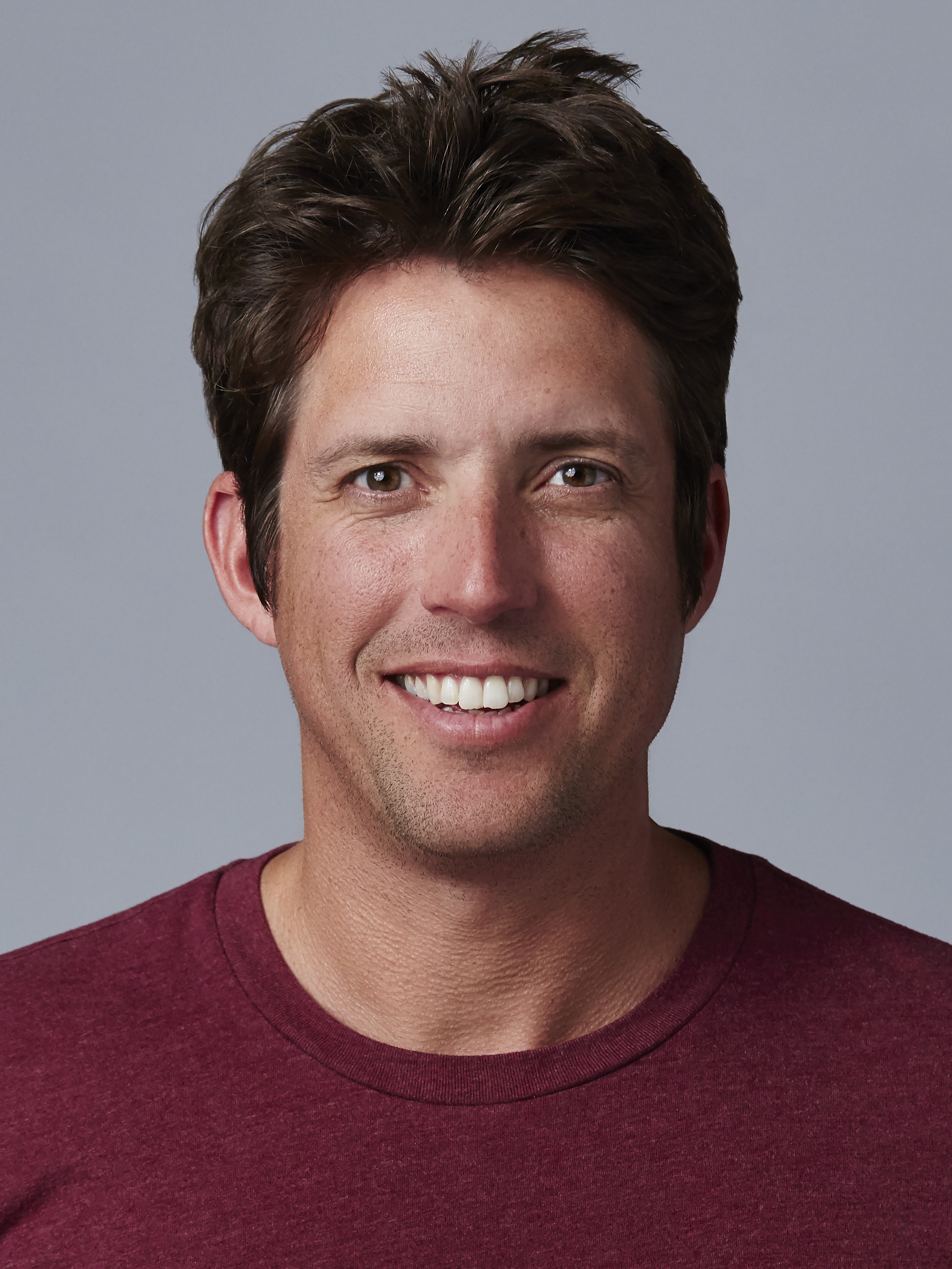
- Woodman in 2016
- Born: June 24, 1975 (age 51)
- Education: University of California, San Diego (BA)
- Occupations: Founder and CEO, GoPro
- Spouse: Jill R. Scully
- Children: 3
- Parent(s): Dean Woodman; Concepcion Socarras
- Relatives: Irwin Federman (step-father)

Nicholas D. Woodman (born June 24, 1975) is an American businessman, and the founder and CEO of GoPro.

== Early life and education ==
Woodman is the son of Concepcion (née Socarras) and Dean Woodman. His father was born into a Quaker family and co-founded the investment bank Robertson Stephens; and his mother is of Hispanic descent and re-married Irwin Federman, General Partner of U.S. Venture Partners in 1992. Woodman grew up in Menlo Park, California and Atherton, California, attending the Menlo School, where he graduated in 1993. He earned a bachelor's degree in visual arts and a minor in creative writing from the University of California, San Diego in 1997.

After school, Woodman founded two startups, both of which never fully made it off the ground. The first was a website called EmpowerAll.com, which attempted to sell electronic goods for no more than a $2 markup, and the second was Funbug, a gaming and marketing platform that gave users the chance to win cash prizes. Woodman received a $235,000 investment from his father, an investment banker in Silicon Valley, and used his parents' connections in venture capital to launch GoPro.

== Career ==
While in Australia and Indonesia on a surf trip, he used a 35mm camera attached to the palm of his hand by a rubber band to try to capture his surfing activities on film. Seeing that amateur photographers like him, who wanted to capture high quality action photos of their activities, had difficulties because either they could not get close enough to the action or were unable to purchase appropriate quality equipment at affordable prices, his trip became his inspiration to found GoPro. His solution was to develop a belt that would attach the camera to the body. To finance the business, Woodman borrowed $200,000 from his father, who still owned a 6.4% stake in May 2014. Nick also borrowed $35,000 and a sewing machine from his mother, which he used to sew camera straps while experimenting with early designs. Woodman and his future wife Jill generated an additional $10,000 by selling beads and shell necklaces they bought in Bali out of their old Volkswagen bus along the California coast. His desire for a camera system that could capture close up footage inspired the GoPro name, as, at that time, the only surfers who were filmed were the professionals.

The first GoPro product was a 35mm film camera developed by a Chinese company named Hotax that incorporated Woodman's custom wrist strap, slight modifications to the housing, and the GoPro logo. Hotax sold Woodman the rebranded camera for $3.05 and the cameras retailed for about $30. Woodman would go about selling his products while using his 1971 Volkswagen Bus that he named The Buscuit as his mobile home. The product has since evolved into a compact digital camera that supports WiFi, can be remotely controlled, has waterproof housing and records to a microSD card.

In 2004, Woodman made his first big sale when a Japanese company ordered 100 cameras at a sports show. Thereafter, sales doubled every year, and in 2012, GoPro sold 2.3 million cameras. In 2005, Woodman appeared on QVC to sell his GoPro Hero. In 2004, GoPro had about $150,000 in revenue which grew to about $350,000 in 2005. In December 2012, the Taiwanese contract manufacturer Foxconn purchased 8.88% of the company for $200 million which set the market value of the company at $2.25 billion making Woodman, who owned the majority of the stock, a billionaire. On June 26, 2014, GoPro went public – closing the day at $31.34 a share. In 2014, Woodman was the highest paid US chief executive, paying himself $235 million while GoPro earned profits of $128 million.

In 2015, GoPro formed a partnership with the NHL in which the NHL would use GoPro products to improve the viewing experience for fans. Woodman was invited to speak at various tech conferences, and in October 2015, Woodman was a guest on The Late Show with Stephen Colbert and wore a GoPro camera for the entirety of the interview. Woodman appeared as a shark investor in the sixth season of the show Shark Tank. Woodman had invested $125,000 as of November 2015 on Shark Tank on two investments.

GoPro made a series of job cuts in 2016-2018. In January 2016, it cut 100 jobs, or 7% of its workforce. In November 2016, GoPro cut an additional 15% of its workforce after attempting to branch out beyond its core business of action cameras, as the entertainment division failed to reach profitability. Additional layoffs followed in March 2017. In January 2018, GoPro announced they were removing drones from their product lineup and reducing the workforce from 1,254 employees to fewer than 1,000. In January 2018 Woodman announced that he was open to selling GoPro. With the layoffs, GoPro went back to its earlier, flatter structure. "We decided to simplify everything and get back to the business that we knew and loved as a private company", Woodman said.

In December 2016, a class action lawsuit against GoPro was announced. The complaint alleged that GoPro made false and misleading statements to investors and failed to disclose flaws in the company's drones, overstating customer demand, and GoPro's public statements were materially false and misleading.

With the many changes at and involving GoPro, including numerous job cuts and falling stock prices, Woodman was named in a 2016 Fox Business article as one of the year's worst CEOs.

== Awards ==
Woodman won the national Ernst & Young Entrepreneur of the Year award in the retail and consumer products category in 2013. In 2014, Woodman accepted an Emmy Award on behalf of GoPro for Technology and Engineering in the category of Inexpensive Small Rugged HD Camcorders.

== Philanthropy ==
After a successful IPO, the couple donated 5.8 million shares of GoPro stock to the Jill + Nicholas Woodman Foundation, a fund they created at the Silicon Valley Community Foundation, a Donor-advised fund in 2014. This donation allowed Nick Woodman to reduce his taxable income by approximately $450 million while avoiding capital gains taxes on the sale of the stock. From 2014 to 2018, the value of the donated GoPro stock declined from $500 million to $36.1 million. Woodman has not announced when or how much of the original stock the foundation sold. Woodman was one of the biggest donors in the tech industry in 2014; however, it angered investors because the donation avoided the typical 180-day waiting period after an IPO.

In March 2014, Woodman was honored for his philanthropic work with BUILD at their 5th annual gala in San Francisco.

In 2015, the foundation donated $2.85 million to a child abuse prevention center in San Francisco and a community center in Montana for $4 million in 2019. It has also donated to the Bonny Doon Art, Wine and Brew Festival. Beyond these disclosures, efforts to find evidence of philanthropic distribution activity from Woodman's donor-advised fund have found no trace.

== Personal life ==
Woodman is married to Jill R. Scully. They have three boys together. Woodman has owned a 180-foot yacht, a Gulfstream V jet and properties in Hawaii and Montana. From 2012-2020 he owned an estate in Woodside, California. From 2014, Woodman owned a 150 acre property in Bonny Doon, California. The Bonny Doon property, which Woodman called "Boogie Ranch", went on the market in July 2020 for $20 million.

In May 2015, Woodman hosted an AMA on Reddit.
