= Startup:Education =

Non-profit foundation launched by Mark Zuckerberg

Startup:Education is a non-profit foundation launched by Mark Zuckerberg with a $100 million foundation dedicated to improving education in Newark, New Jersey The foundation is dedicated to improving the quality of public education in this country by investing in great classroom experiences to ensure that every child has access to the skills and opportunities they need to reach their full potential.
