= GoPro =

American technology company

GoPro, Inc.
- Formerly: Woodman Labs, Inc.
- Type: Public
- Traded as: Nasdaq: GPRO (Class A); Russell 2000 component
- Industry: Technology; Videography; Consumer electronics
- Founded: 2002; 24 years ago
- Founder: Nick Woodman
- Headquarters: San Mateo, California, U.S.
- Area served: Worldwide
- Key people: Nick Woodman (CEO)
- Products: Action camera; Video editing software; Mobile app
- Revenue: ▼US$801 million (2024)
- Operating income: ▼ −US$135 million (2024)
- Net income: ▼ −US$432 million (2024)
- Total assets: ▼US$544 million (2024)
- Total equity: ▼US$152 million (2024)
- Owner: Nick Woodman (64%)
- Number of employees: 696 (2024)
- Subsidiaries: CineForm; Replay; Splice
- Website: gopro.com

GoPro, Inc. (marketed as GoPro or as goPRO) is an American technology company founded in 2002 by Nick Woodman that went public in 2014 on the Nasdaq stock exchange under the ticker GPRO. It manufactures action cameras and develops its own mobile apps and video-editing software. GoPro cameras are widely used for adventure sports, travel recording, and outdoor activities. Founded as Woodman Labs, Inc, the company is based in San Mateo, California.

It developed a quadcopter drone, Karma, released in October 2016, but discontinued it after two years. In January 2018, the company hired JPMorgan Chase to pursue the option of selling the company. However, a month later, the CEO denied this. GoPro has continued its business of manufacturing action cameras.

GoPro frequently partners with athletes; the company has successfully completed partnerships with Kelly Slater, Jimmy Chin, and Jonas Deichmann. In 2016, GoPro had 160 athletes on its payroll.

== History ==
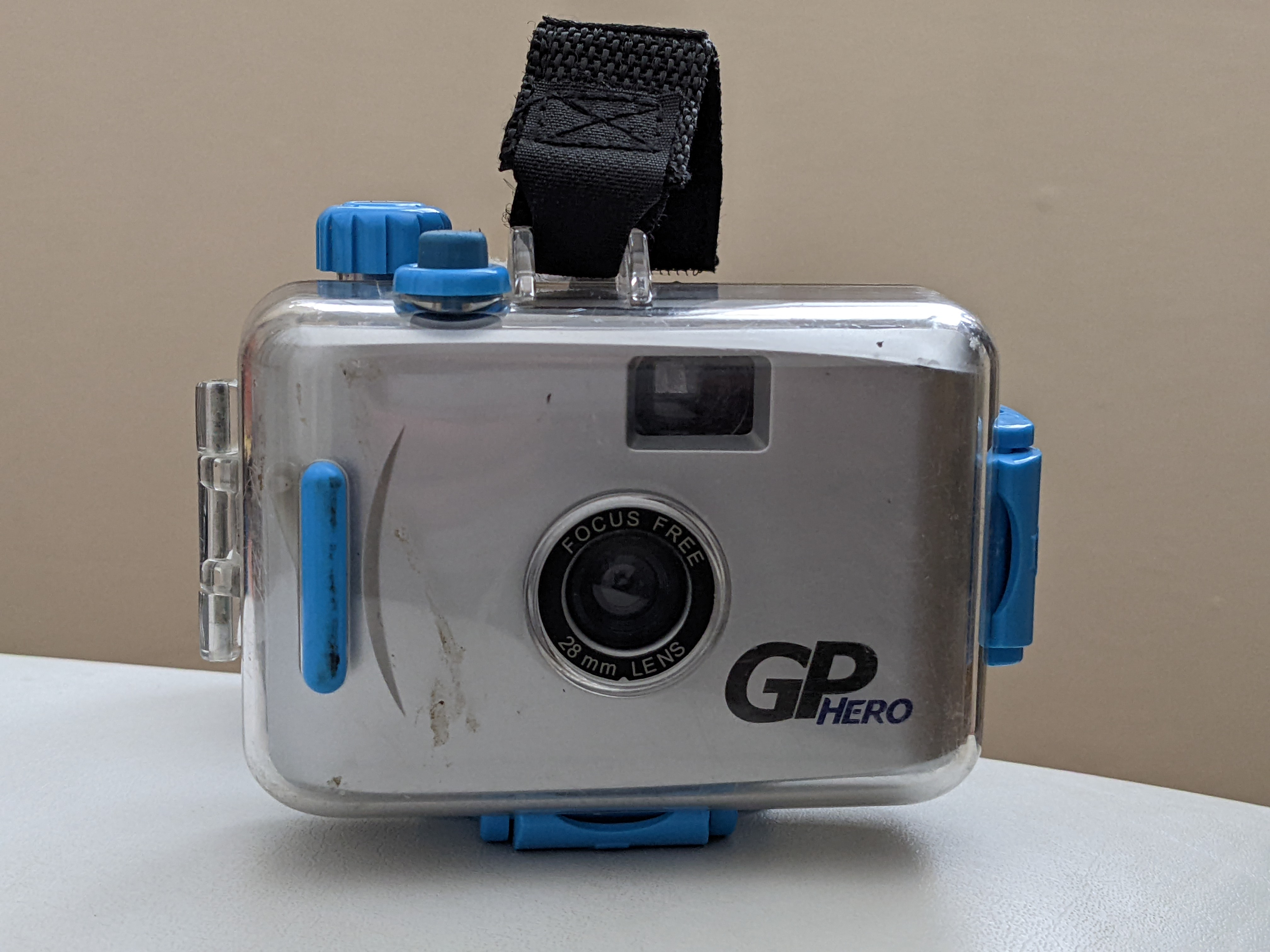
The first GoPro Hero, a film camera encased in a waterproof shell

The company was founded by Nick Woodman in 2002. He was motivated by a 2002 surfing trip to Australia, in which he was hoping to capture high-quality action photos but could not because amateur photographers could not get close enough or buy appropriate quality equipment at reasonable prices. The 'GoPro' name came about as Woodman and his surfing friends all aspired to become professional surfers, as 'going pro' was the ultimate goal and the only way to be filmed on the water at that time. The camera range was branded 'Hero' as their aim was to capture close-up action shots that made the subject look like a hero. GoPro also runs the "GoPro Awards" program, where users can submit photos and videos captured with GoPro cameras for a chance to receive cash rewards and social media recognition.

Woodman received over $230,000 from his parents to invest in the business. He also raised a portion of his initial capital by selling bead and shell belts for under US$20 from his VW van and, later, fashionable camera straps.

In 2004, the company sold its first camera system, which used 35 mm film. Digital still and video cameras were later introduced. As of 2014, a fixed-lens HD video camera with a wide 170-degree lens was available; two or more can be paired to create 360 video.

On June 4, 2014, the company announced the appointment of former Microsoft executive Tony Bates as president, reporting directly to Woodman.

After growing the number of employees by more than 500 in 2015, the company responded to weak sales in the fourth quarter by cutting about 7% of its workforce (100 workers) in January 2016.

In July 2016, GoPro revealed they had been acquiring expertise from three French technology firms over the previous 18 months. In November 2016, the company announced it was laying off an additional 200 employees in an effort to reduce costs. The company also announced that President Tony Bates would be stepping down at the end of 2016. 270 more employees were laid off in March 2017, and 250 additional layoffs followed in January 2018, bringing the company's workforce to "just under 1,000".

At its peak, a share of GoPro was valued at US$86, but as of June 26, 2024 it was only $1.33.

Because of the COVID-19 pandemic in 2020, GoPro laid off more than 20 percent of its workforce - over 200 employees. In 2010, GoPro made user-generated content (UGC) a formal part of its marketing strategy. The company launched the Million Dollar Challenge, an annual contest where users submit short video clips for a chance to win prize money. GoPro also introduced the GoPro Awards program to recognize and reward its top content contributors.

In April 2026, GoPro was taken as mission equipment by NASA around the Moon on Artemis II.

In June 2026, it was reported that GoPro was in financial trouble due to declining sales and the increasing cost of memory, contributed by the AI data crisis. Reuters reported that GoPro intended to review a range of options including a sale of the company or a merger. On September 1, 2026, GoPro announced that it entered a merger with Starman Optical, a private company optical parts maker. Under the US$ 285 million agreement, Starman would acquire 90% of GoPro with GoPro's existing shareholders holding the remaining 10%, repay GoPro's US$ 92 million debt, and add its products, optical transceivers, to GoPro's product offering.

=== Corporate actions ===
On March 30, 2011, GoPro acquired CineForm. The acquisition included the CineForm 444 video codec. The company claimed that the codec "makes HD and 3D editing faster and more convenient without sacrificing image quality." It was incorporated into the company's 3D Hero System shortly after the acquisition.

In March 2013, GoPro issued a DMCA takedown notice to the website DigitalRev.com, which had posted a review of its product, citing trademark use as a breach of copyright. This notice was retracted 10 days later, citing "erroneous enforcement".

On April 28, 2015, GoPro acquired Kolor, a spherical media and virtual reality startup based in Chambéry, France. Kolor were the developers of Autopano, Autopano Video and Panotour. After September 14, 2018, Kolor products will no longer be for sale, and Kolor products will no longer receive updates.

On February 29, 2016, GoPro spent $105 million and acquired two start-ups—Stupeflix and Vemory—for their video editing tools, Replay and Splice.

In March 2020, GoPro acquired the stabilization software company, ReelSteady.

In February 2024, GoPro acquired Forcite Helmet Systems, a privately held manufacturer of technology-enabled helmets, for approximately $14 million.

In May 2026, GoPro announced that it was reviewing strategic alternatives, including a potential sale or merger, after receiving unsolicited strategic inquiries.

In July 2026, GoPro entered into a securities purchase agreement with entities affiliated with CEO and chairman Nicholas Woodman for $20 million in senior secured notes and warrants.

In September 2026, GoPro entered into an agreement to merge with Starman Optical through Action Acquisitions. Under the agreement, GoPro shareholders are to receive $1.14 in cash and 0.1 share of the surviving company for each GoPro share, subject to the terms of the agreement. Starman Optical's optical-photonics business is expected to expand the combined company's activities into AI data centers, government, defense, and aerospace markets.

=== Marketing strategy ===
GoPro's marketing strategy relies heavily on user-generated content (UGC). The company encourages customers to capture and share photos and videos taken with GoPro cameras on social media platforms such as YouTube, Instagram, and TikTok. GoPro frequently features these videos on its official channels and organizes initiatives such as the GoPro Awards and the Million Dollar Challenge, which reward users for submitting high-quality content created with GoPro devices. This strategy allows the company to promote its products through authentic experiences shared by users rather than relying primarily on traditional advertising.

In addition to featuring customer-created content, GoPro has developed a community-driven approach through initiatives such as GoPro Awards and the Million Dollar Challenge. These programs allow users to submit original photos and videos captured with GoPro cameras, with selected creators receiving recognition and rewards. Through these initiatives, GoPro encourages participation from its user community while generating authentic content for its marketing activities.

GoPro has heavily invested in retail advocacy and education programs as a core component of its growth strategy. GoPro developed a custom retail training program with the support of YourBrandLive, ExpertVoice, and Mosaic. The program used online and offline training programs to help inspire and educate retail staff in an attempt to increase sell through velocity and protect market share. The initiative was covered by Transworld Business in 2013 as an example of how brands could use advocacy programs to drive retail performance and build loyalty across mass, CE, and specialty retailers around the world. "GoPro has used user-generated content as a core part of its marketing strategy, encouraging customers to submit footage captured with its cameras for use in promotional campaigns."

=== 2014 IPO (stock launch) ===
On February 7, 2014, GoPro submitted a confidential filing for an initial public offering (IPO) with the Securities and Exchange Commission (SEC).

On May 19, 2014, GoPro filed its Form S-1 with the SEC without specifying the number of shares or their price. The company stated that they hoped to raise at least $100 million through the sale of shares, using the money to pay off debt in full ($111 million as of March 31, 2014) and "to acquire or invest in complementary businesses, technologies or assets". They said that they planned to list on the NASDAQ stock exchange using the symbol 'GPRO.'

The expected price range was $21 to $24 a share; on June 25, 2014, GoPro sold 17.8 million shares to initial investors at $24 per share (totaling $427.2M). At the IPO price the company was valued at $2.95 billion.

One reason for GoPro's decision to go public was the perceived potential to become a media company to generate additional revenue from the content its cameras created, but this vision did not materialize.

In August 2026, the American YouTuber Mark Fischbach, known online as Markiplier, acquired an 8.5% stake in GoPro, becoming its largest outside shareholder. An avid user of GoPros, Fischbach is not a professional investor but said that he wanted the company to succeed.

== Product lines ==
=== HERO cameras ===
Woodman worked on his first camera for two years after founding the company, eventually introducing the GoPro 35mm HERO waterproof film camera in September 2004 at San Diego's Action Sports Retailer trade show. In its first year GoPro sold $150,000 worth of products. In 2006 the company introduced its first Digital HERO, with 10 second video capability, and generated $800,000 in revenue. The following year GoPro sales quadrupled to $3.4 million.

In 2014, the company was selling the HERO3+ in editions of different colors. It was capable of filming in 16:9 aspect ratio, supporting 4K UHD video and 12 MP still photographs. The HERO4 was introduced on September 24, 2014.

On September 28, 2017, GoPro released the HERO6 Black, which claims improved stabilization over the HERO5 models and is capable of capturing 4K video in 60 FPS.

On September 20, 2018, GoPro came out with the HERO7 Black, which apart from providing improved stabilization over HERO6 models with HyperSmooth, also featured the new form of video capturing, "TimeWarp", providing a high speed effect to the videos. HERO7 also came out with capability to stream live across multiple platforms like Facebook and YouTube. On July 11, 2018, GoPro announced that it had sold more than 30 million HERO cameras since inception.

On October 15, 2019, GoPro released the HERO8 Black, which included improved in-camera stabilization by way of HyperSmooth 2.0. The HERO8 Black introduced integrated mounting 'fingers' which could be folded down for use.

On September 9, 2020, GoPro released the HERO9 Black, which saw the reinstatement of the user-replaceable lens and a new front-facing screen.

On September 10, 2024, GoPro released the HERO13 Black, which introduced a variety of new lens options, including a macro lens and ND filters. An option for an anamorphic lens will release in 2025.

The HERO line has gained widespread popularity for recording first person point of view videos.

=== GoPro KARMA & GoPro KARMA Grip ===
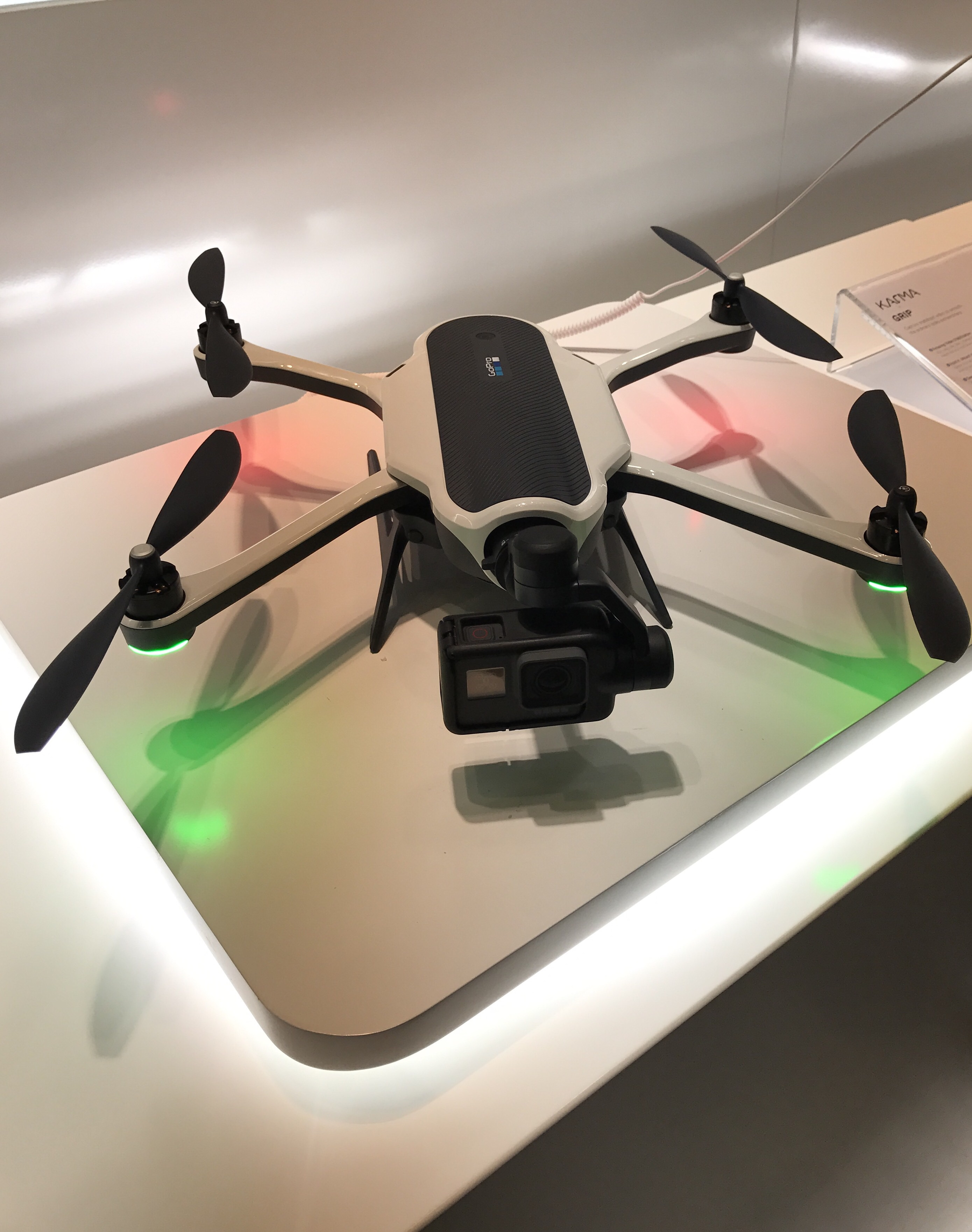
GoPro Karma Drone

The GoPro Karma was GoPro's consumer drone until its discontinuation in January 2018.

In 2014, GoPro entered into discussions with DJI for a private label model built with the GoPro branding. After the failure of these negotiations, GoPro entered into an agreement with 3D Robotics (3DR) for a similar partnership based on 3DR's flight controllers. 3DR failed to meet their agreed-upon timelines. As a result, GoPro took full control of the development process in mid-2015.

Scheduled to be released in early 2016, the GoPro Karma project was delayed several times before the GoPro Karma was announced with an introduction date of October 23, 2016. The Karma was released along with newer models of the HERO5 and Session cameras and features a removable handheld stabilizer (gimbal) integrated into the design. After a few customers complained about power failure during operation, GoPro recalled Karma drones and gave customers full refunds.

In February 2017, GoPro relaunched the Karma Drone. However, in January 2018, GoPro Inc. said that it will be cutting more than 20 percent of its global workforce and putting an end to its drone business after a disappointing fourth quarter. The company said it expects sales of about $340 million, well short of its own previous projection of as much as $480 million and the average analyst estimate of $472 million. Their revenue took an $80 million hit due to discounting for its Karma drones, as well as its Hero line of cameras, over the holiday season.

=== GoPro 360° cameras ===
In November 2017, GoPro launched the Fusion camera, an omnidirectional camera which is capable of recording 360-degree footage. The Fusion was the first GoPro to feature an increased maximum resolution of 5.8K. In October 2019, GoPro updated this line-up with the introduction of the GoPro MAX.

=== Accessories ===
GoPro produces various mounting accessories for its cameras including a 3-way mount, suction cup, chest harness, jaws-type flexible clamp, dog harness, surfing mount, etc.

=== Video editing ===
The company developed GoPro Studio, a simple video editing software to edit camera footage. It was reported that GoPro intended to also become a content provider, also with a new app for the HERO5 called GoPro Quik to share and edit videos easier. You can also edit and shoot photos and videos using the GoPro app released in 2015.

In 2020, Gopro canceled their GoPro Quik software support for Windows and Mac, leaving it just to mobile devices. However, in February 2024, a new version of the Quik app was released on MacOS, with a version for Windows coming later in the year.

In April 2014, GoPro was listed by Adweek as one of the "Top 10 Best Brand Channels on YouTube" based on a combination of views, shares, comments, and overall engagement. Content is uploaded daily, an additional source of revenue for the company.

As part of its transformation to a media company in 2014, GoPro created additional channels with GoPro content on YouTube, Virgin America, and Xbox Live. This was extended to the PlayStation Network in 2015.

== Products ==
The GoPro was originally designed for surfing and capturing pro camera angles, hence the name. GoPro cameras are widely used in extreme sports, travel vlogging, filmmaking, and adventure documentation due to their compact size and durability.

=== HERO cameras ===
Early GoPro HERO cameras (2005–11)
Model	35 mm	Digital HERO	Digital HERO3	Digital HERO5	Wide HERO	HD HERO	HD HERO 960	HD HERO2
Generation	Film	Digital (1st)				HD (2nd)		
Angle of View	75° (28 mm lens)	54°			170°	170° 127° (1080p)	170°	170° 127° (1080p or 720p); 90°
Aperture	fixed	f/2.8						
Dimensions	?	?	2.60 in × 1.75 in × 1.25 in (66 mm × 44 mm × 32 mm)		2.4 in × 1.6 in × 0.9 in (61 mm × 41 mm × 23 mm)	2.4 in × 1.6 in × 1.2 in (61 mm × 41 mm × 30 mm)		?
Weight	7.2 oz (200 g)	?	4.5 oz (130 g)		4.0 oz (110 g)	3.3 oz (94 g); 5.9 oz (170 g) (Note: With housing)		?
Video modes	N/A	240p (10 s)	384p30 (4:3)			1080p30, 960p30, 720p30/60, 480p60	960p30, 720p30, 480p60	1080p30, 960p48/30, 720p60/30, 480p120/60
Still image resolution	N/A	VGA	3.0 MP	5.0 MP				11/8/5 MP
Photo burst	N/A	1	3					10
Connectivity	N/A	USB	USB, phono			Mini USB 2.0, component		USB

==== 35 mm ====
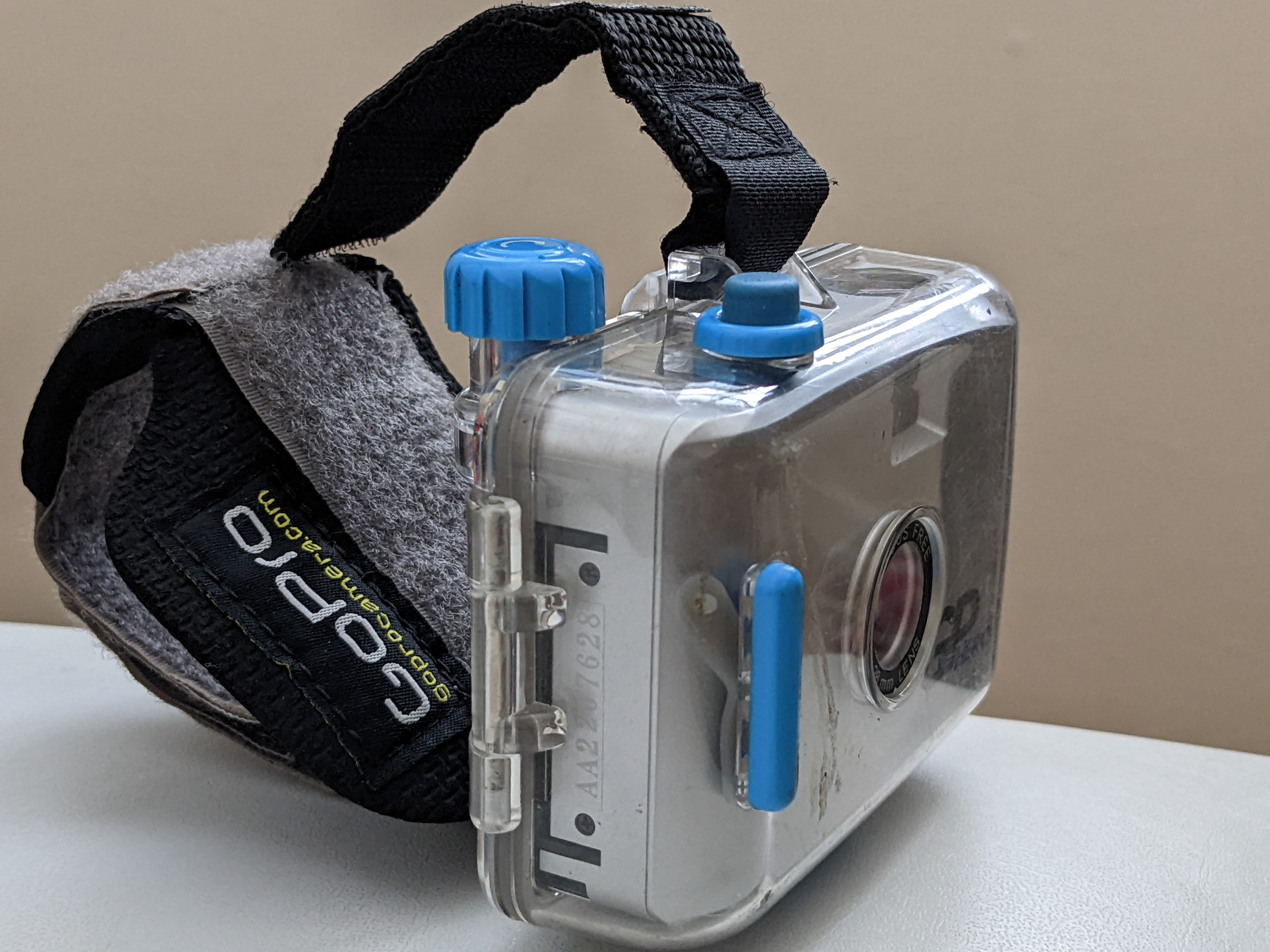
35 mm GoPro Hero in waterproof case attached to wrist strap

The 35 mm camera (model #001) became available on April 13, 2005. It had dimensions of 2.5 by 3 inches (64 by 76 mm) and weighed 0.45 pounds (200 g). It included the camera, a clear case with quick release, a camera strap, and a ski glove adapter lash. It could pivot "on the fly" and be functional to a depth in water of about 15 feet (5 m). It was described as a "reusable wrist camera" and included a roll of 24-exposure Kodak 400 film.

==== Digital (1st gen) ====
The first generation of Digital HERO cameras (2006–09) were powered by conventional AAA batteries and included a rugged housing and wrist strap. Models were distinguished by their still image resolution and shot video in standard definition (480 lines or lower) with a 4:3 aspect ratio. Like the film camera HERO, the first-generation Digital HERO cameras were equipped with an optical viewfinder.

The original Digital HERO (DH1; 640×480 still resolution, 240p video in 10-second clips) of 2006 was succeeded by the Digital HERO3 (DH3; 3-megapixel stills, 384p video) and Digital HERO5 (DH5; same as DH3 but with 5-megapixel stills). All three of these had a 54° angle of view. A variant of the DH5 was released with an extreme wide-angle lens with 170° of angular coverage on the diagonal as the Wide HERO; the Wide HERO had a different housing than the other first-gen cameras (DH1/DH3/DH5) to accommodate its larger lens.

===== Digital HERO =====
The Digital HERO released in 2006 (Model: SQ907 mini-cam) had a 640×480 camera and shot QVGA definition 320×240 (10 fps) video for a maximum of 10 seconds. The Digital HERO1 had 32 MB internal memory without SD slot.

===== Digital HERO3 =====
The Digital HERO3, released on February 21, 2007, had a 3-megapixel camera and shot standard definition 512×384 video. It was rated up to 30 m (98 ft) in depth.

===== Digital HERO5 =====
The Digital HERO5 was first introduced in 2008. It had a 5-megapixel still photo sensor and supported standard definition (512×384) video capture. It ran on two AAA batteries, had 16 MB of internal memory and could function with a 2 GB SD card. Its housing was rated to 100 ft/30 m of depth. Its dimensions were 2.6 in × 1.75 in × 1.25 in (66 mm × 44 mm × 32 mm). The camera is not designed to work with the newer HD HERO line of housings, although the standard screw mounts are indeed compatible.

The DH5 was marketed with a basic camera and housing as the Wrist HERO, or bundled with accessories as the Motorsports HERO.

===== Wide HERO =====
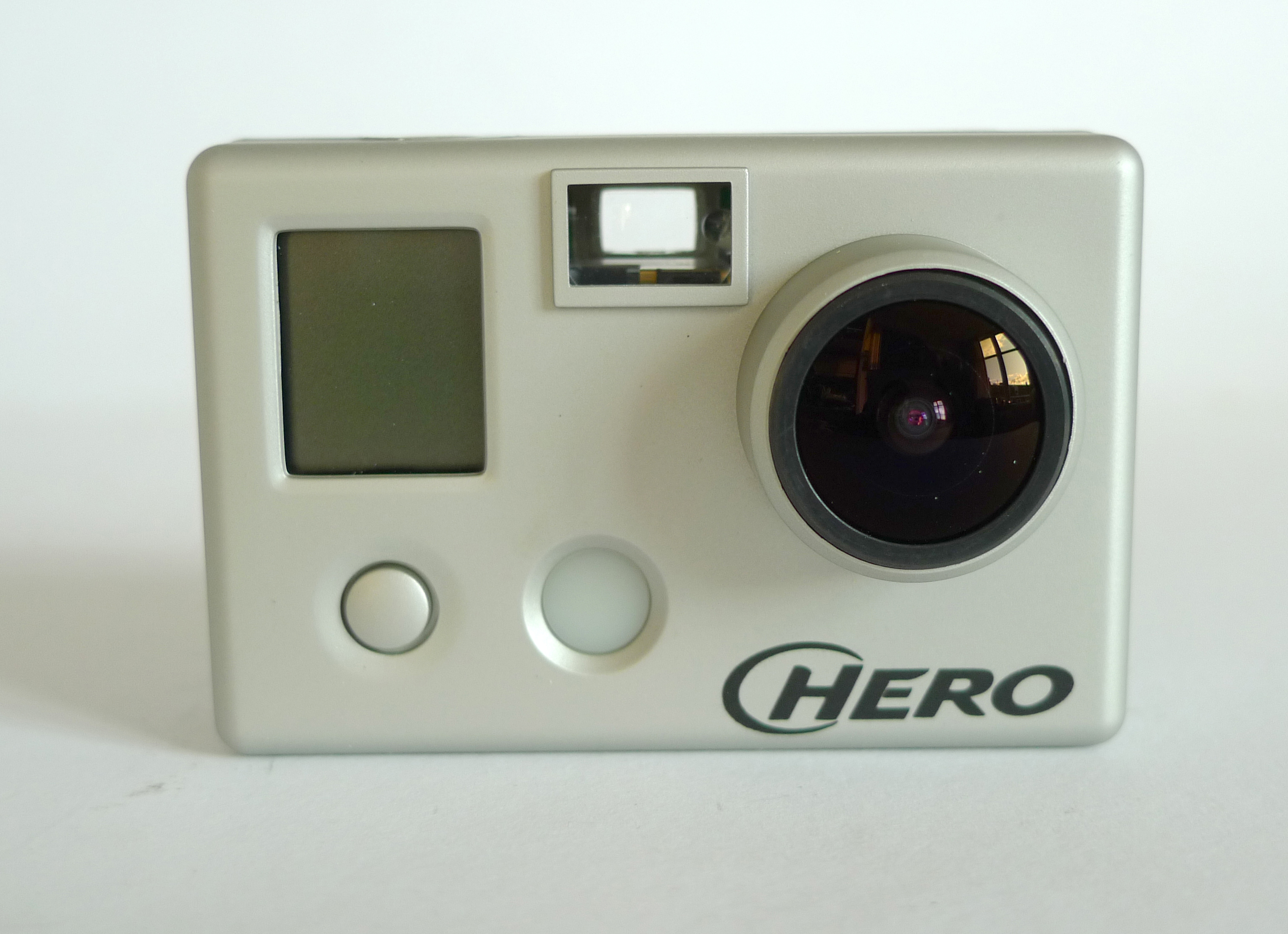
Wide HERO (note optical viewfinder)

The GoPro Wide HERO was the first model with a 170° wide-angle lens. It was released in 2008 alongside the Digital HERO5 and had the same 5 MP sensor (2592×1944), capable of 512×384 at 30 fps video with sound recording (up to 56 min. on a 2 GB SD card), 5 MP Photos, 10 s self-timer, 3× sequence still photo burst and Auto "Photo every 2 or 5 seconds" mode. It was powered by 2 × AAA batteries (not included in the box).

The Wide HERO was marketed with the basic camera and housing alone, or bundled with accessories (as the Surf HERO, Motorsports HERO Wide, or Helmet HERO Wide). The camera was later renamed the SD HERO 170 to emphasize the differences with the succeeding HD HERO second-generation cameras.

==== HD (2nd gen) ====
The second generation of the HERO cameras (2010–11) were branded HD HERO for their upgraded resolution, now offering up to 1080p high-definition video. With the HD HERO generation, GoPro replaced the optical viewfinder with an optional LCD monitor.

===== HD HERO =====
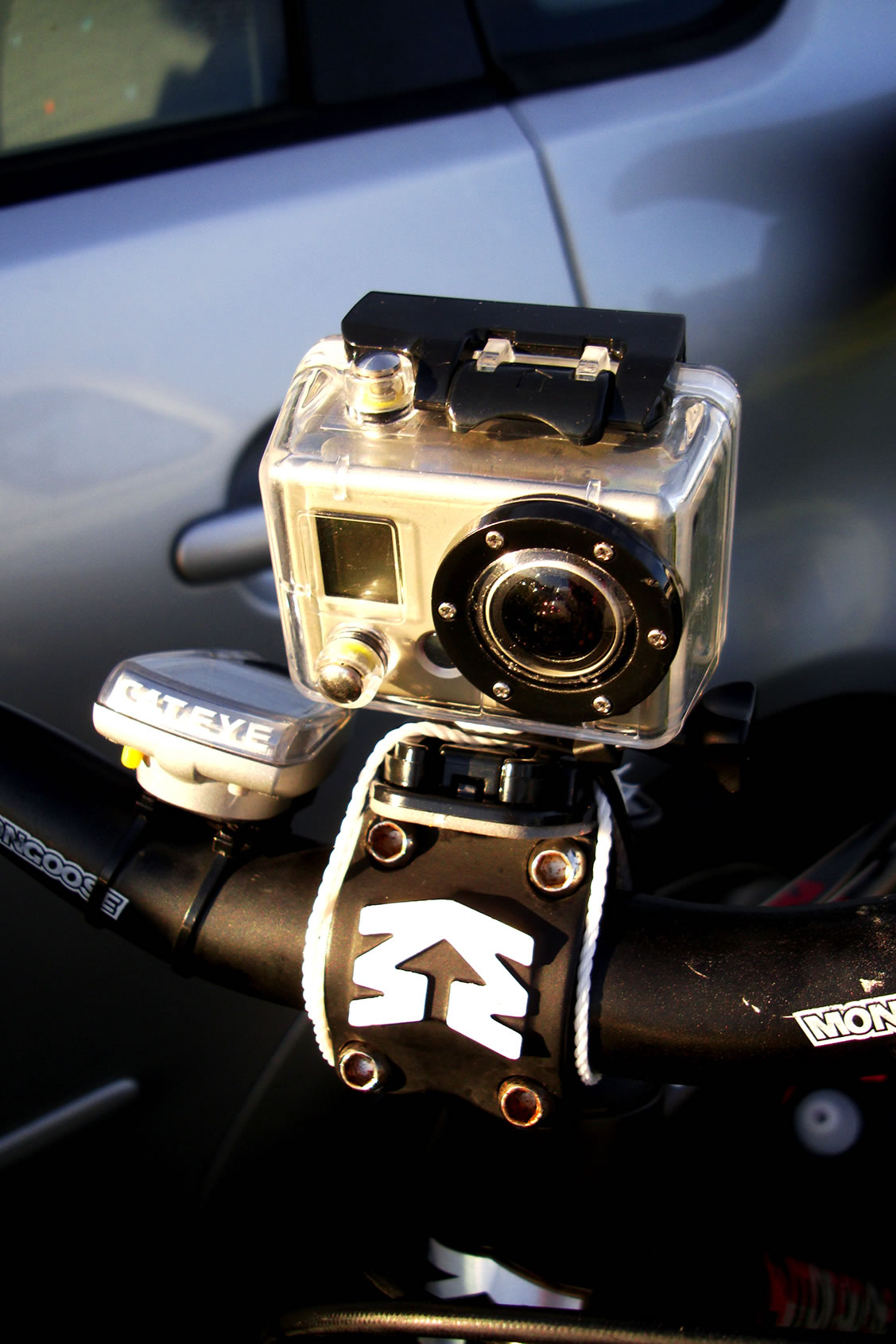
HD HERO mounted on bicycle stem/handlebars

The basic HD HERO was marketed either with a basic set of accessories (case and mount) as the "Naked" or in bundles with additional accessories named for the intended purpose (such as the HD Helmet HERO, HD Motorsports HERO, and HD Surf HERO). For all HD HERO variants, the camera shoots a maximum of 1080p video with a reduced field of view (127°) on its 5 MP sensor. Alternative resolutions for the HD HERO included 960p30, 720p60, 720p30, and 480p60, with the same wide-angle (170°) view as the previous-generation Wide HERO. It was first listed on January 25, 2010.

HD HERO specifications:

- Sensor size: 1/2.5-inch (5.75 mm × 4.28 mm)
- Pixel size: 2.2 μm
- Connectivity: Mini USB 2.0; Component
- Image formats:

Mode	Size	fps	FOV
R1	848×480	60	170°
R2	1280×720	30	170°
R3	1280×720	60	170°
R4	1280×960	30	170°
R5	1920×1080	30	127°
Photo	2592×1944	0	170°

The HD HERO also offered an expansion port on the camera's rear panel, branded the HERO Bus. Optional accessories included the LCD Bakpac, which offered a small monitor that displayed and played back video, and the Battery Bakpac, which doubled the battery life of the camera.

===== HD HERO 960 =====
HD HERO 960 was a reduced-cost version of the HD HERO that shoots at a maximum video resolution of 960p30 and is not compatible with the electronic accessories for the HD HERO because it lacks the proprietary HERO Bus expansion port, although the camera is compatible with all GoPro mounts. It was first listed on August 6, 2010.

===== HD HERO2 =====
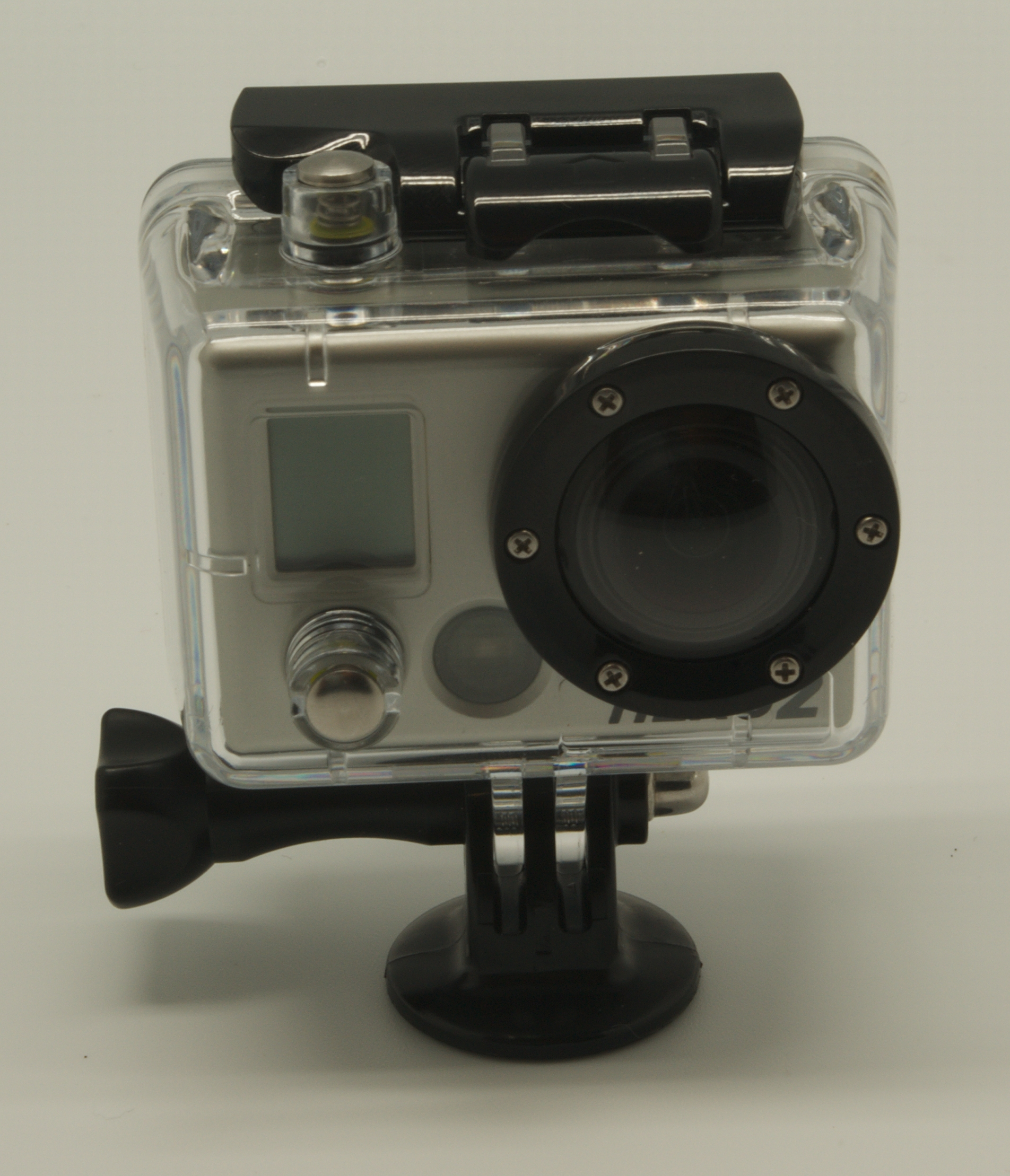
HD HERO2 in housing

The HD HERO2 was launched on October 24, 2011. It has a 1/2.3 in 11 MP image sensor, improved low-light capability and records at up to 120 fps. It was sold with three different accessory packages as the Outdoor, Motorsports, and Surf Editions.

==== HERO3 (White/Silver/Black) ====
HERO3

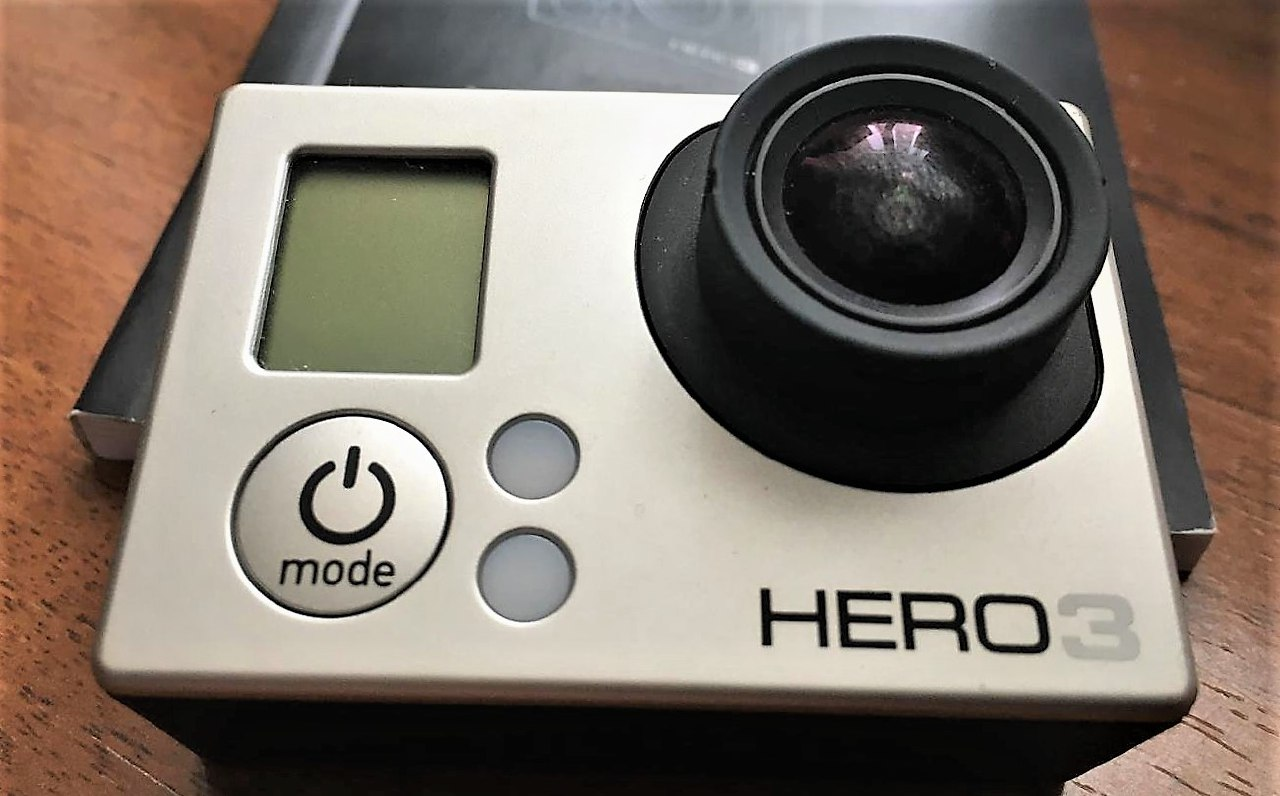
White

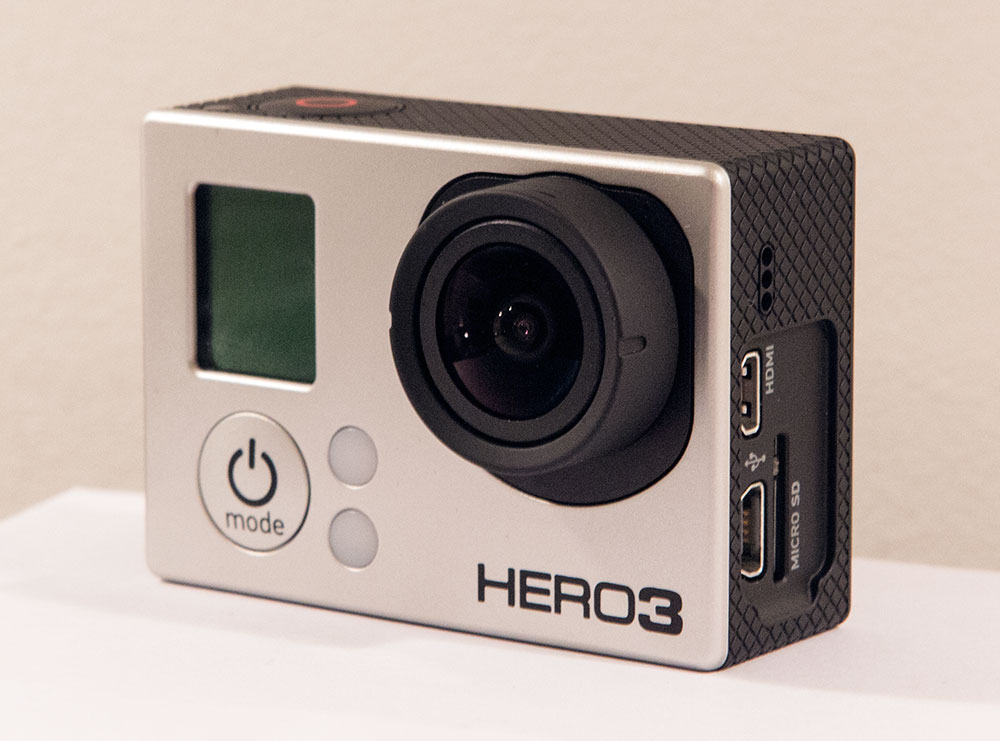
Black

In late 2012, GoPro announced the HERO3 line of cameras. These cameras came in three editions: black, silver, and white, denoting the relative capabilities of each camera in descending order. Externally, the model is distinguished by the ink used to print the number "3" on the front of the camera.

All three versions of the HERO3 come in a 30% smaller and 25% lighter package, with Wi-Fi built in. The change of the physical dimensions of the cameras compared to the previous generations (HD HERO and HD HERO2 were physically identical) means that some accessories for HD HERO Original and HERO2 are not compatible with HERO3, so GoPro made new versions of those accessories specifically for HERO3, which mostly also were compatible with HERO3+, see below. Those new versions of accessories are usually not compatible with older Hero camera generations. However, a lot of other accessories are compatible with all HD Hero camera generations.

The HERO3 Silver and Black cameras have significantly less battery endurance than the HD HERO Original and HERO2. For example, in 720p resolution with 25/30 fps, while the HD HERO Original and HERO2 have a stated battery runtime of 3 hours, the HERO3 Silver Edition has a stated battery runtime of 2 hours, and the HERO3 Black Edition has a stated battery runtime of 1.5 hours (the Black Edition's "most economical" setting is 1080p/30 fps, so this also partially contributes to its poor battery runtime).

The Black Edition has a new 12 MP sensor, the Sony IMX117, that can capture 4K UHD digital video at 15 fps, 2.7K video at 30 fps, 1440p at 48 fps, 1080p at 60 fps, 960p at 100 fps, 720p at 120 fps and WVGA at 240 fps. The IMX117 is the first BSI sensor included in a GoPro. The Black edition also includes the Wi-Fi remote. The Black Edition cannot record at 25/30 fps in 720p and WVGA resolutions; it can only record at very fast frame rates in those resolutions. This is a deliberate firmware limitation, as the manufacturer does not expect that this high-end camera model will be used at these lower resolutions and frame rates.

The Silver Edition uses the same 11 MP sensor as the HD HERO2, and the White edition uses the same 5 MP sensor as the HD HERO Original.

HERO3/3+ models
Model	HERO3 White	HERO3 Silver	HERO3 Black	HERO3+ Silver	HERO3+ Black
Sensor Size	1/2.5 in	1/2.3 in	1/2.3 in	1/2.3 in	1/2.3 in
Aperture	f/2.8				
Dimensions	58.4 mm × 38.1 mm × 20.3 mm (2.30 in × 1.50 in × 0.80 in)				
Weight	74 g (2.6 oz)			74 g (2.6 oz); 136 g (4.8 oz) with case	
Video Modes	1080p30, 960p30, 720p60, 480p60	1080p30, 960p48, 720p60, 480p120	4k15, 2.7k30, 1440p48, 1080p60, 960p100 720p120, 480p240	1080p60, 960p60, 720p120, 480p120	4k15, 2.7k30, 1440p48, 1080p60, 960p100 720p120, 480p240
Video Formats	MP4 (H.264)				
Stabilization	no				
Loop Recording	yes				
Still Image Resolution	5 MP	11 MP	12 MP	10 MP	12 MP
Photo burst	3 fps	10 fps	30 fps	10 fps	30 fps
Connectivity	Wi-Fi				
Battery	replaceable 1050 mAh, Li-Ion				
Wired Connectors	Mini USB, Micro HDMI				
Water Resistance	60 m (200 ft) (with case)			40 m (130 ft) (with case)	
Touchscreen	optional, when equipped with LCD Touch BacPac				
Audio Port	3.5 mm (via USB adapter)				
Launch Price (USD)	$199.99	$299.99	$399.99	$299.99	$399.99

===== HERO3+ (Silver/Black) =====
A timelapse recording one frame every 10 seconds with a GoPro HERO3 camera mounted on a bicycle helmet during a bike ride in Chicago. Note how the wide angle lens allows for the rider to capture wide images.

In October 2013, GoPro released the HERO3+, available in Black and Silver Editions, replacing the HERO3 generation.

The HERO3+ camera models claim dramatically improved low-light performance and have a waterproof enclosure, which is 20% lighter and 15% smaller than the HERO3's, according to the GoPro website. The HERO3+ camera housing is 20% smaller than the HERO3. The cameras are claimed to have improved image sharpness (close focus down to 7 in vs. about 3 ft on the HERO3, at the expense of distant focus, which is slightly less sharp with HERO3+), and better audio functionality with wind noise reduction. Battery life is claimed to be 30% longer than for the HERO3 model (both through better efficiency and a higher-capacity battery of the same dimensions).

The Black Edition has video modes of 1440p48, 1080p60, 960p100 and 720p120 as well as 4k15 and 2.7k30 and can shoot 12 MP stills at up to 30 fps. The HERO3+ Black Edition also offers an optional function in firmware (called "SuperView") that increases the field of view. It has additional functions, including dynamic low-light situation adjustment, higher-quality recording modes (higher bitrates, no white balance applied, etc.), etc. The Black Edition continues to include a Wi-Fi Remote. It does not have the ability to record 25/30 fps in 720p and WVGA modes (it can only record at very fast frame rates in those lower resolutions). This is an intentional firmware limitation. The battery runtime of the HERO3+ Black Edition is significantly longer than that of the HERO3 Black Edition but 30–50% lower than the battery runtime of the older HERO2 and HERO1.

The Silver Edition has video modes of 1080p60 and 720p120 and can shoot 10 MP stills at up to 10 fps. In contrast to the Black Edition, the Silver Edition can record at 25/30 fps (or higher) in all supported resolutions. HERO3+ Silver Edition also has about 25%–50% longer battery runtime during recording than HERO3+ Black Edition (they both use the same batteries). The difference in runtime depends on the resolution/fps combination and whether Wi-Fi and the GoPro mobile application are used during recording. The difference in runtime increases as the fps is lowered and the additional functions are deactivated on both cameras. The battery runtime of the HERO3+ Silver Edition is similar to the battery runtime of the HERO2 and HERO1.

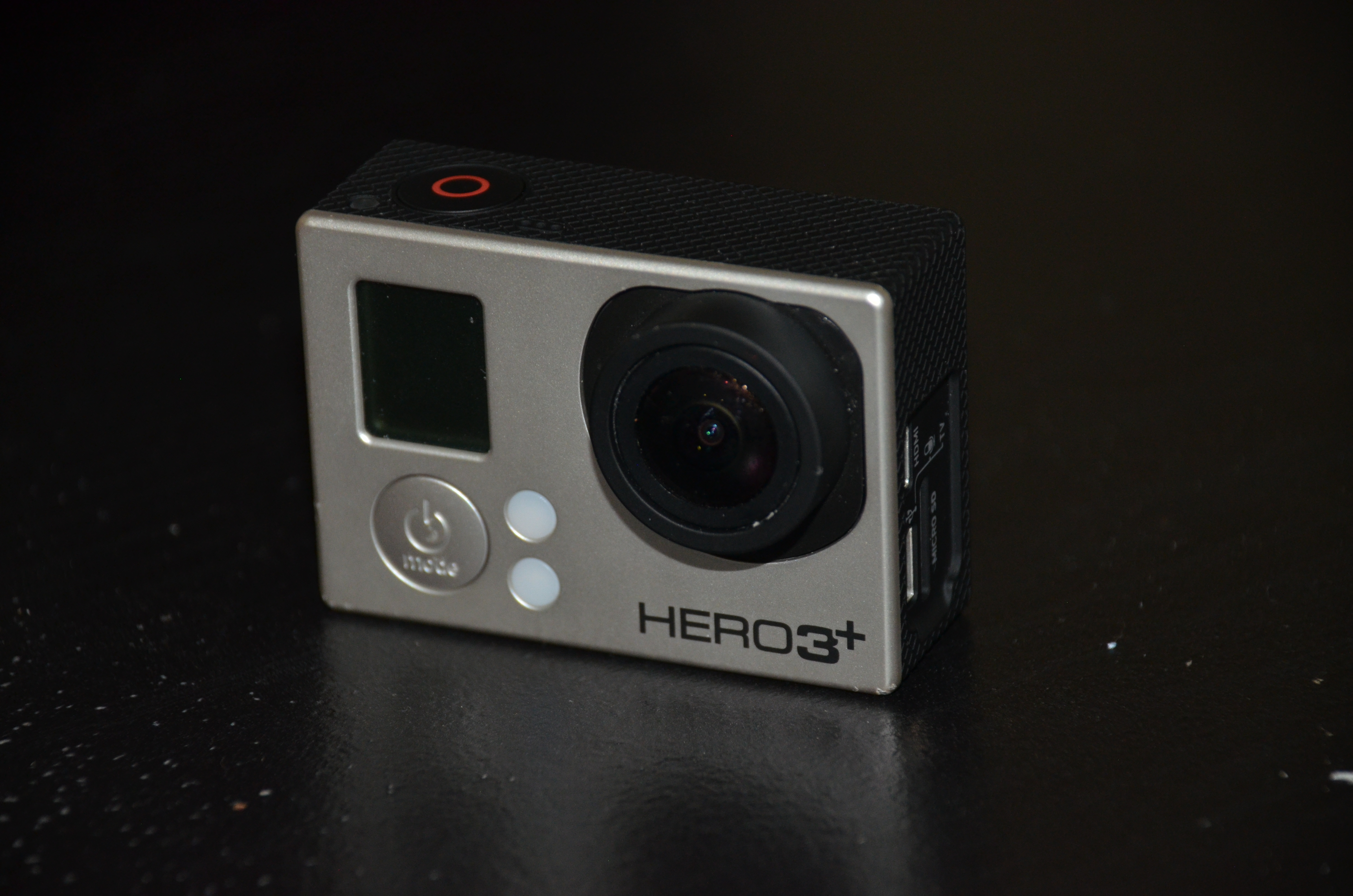
GoPro Hero 3+ Black Edition

The HERO3 HD camera was awarded the 2013 Technology & Engineering Emmy Award for its contribution to television.

==== HERO4 (Silver/Black) ====
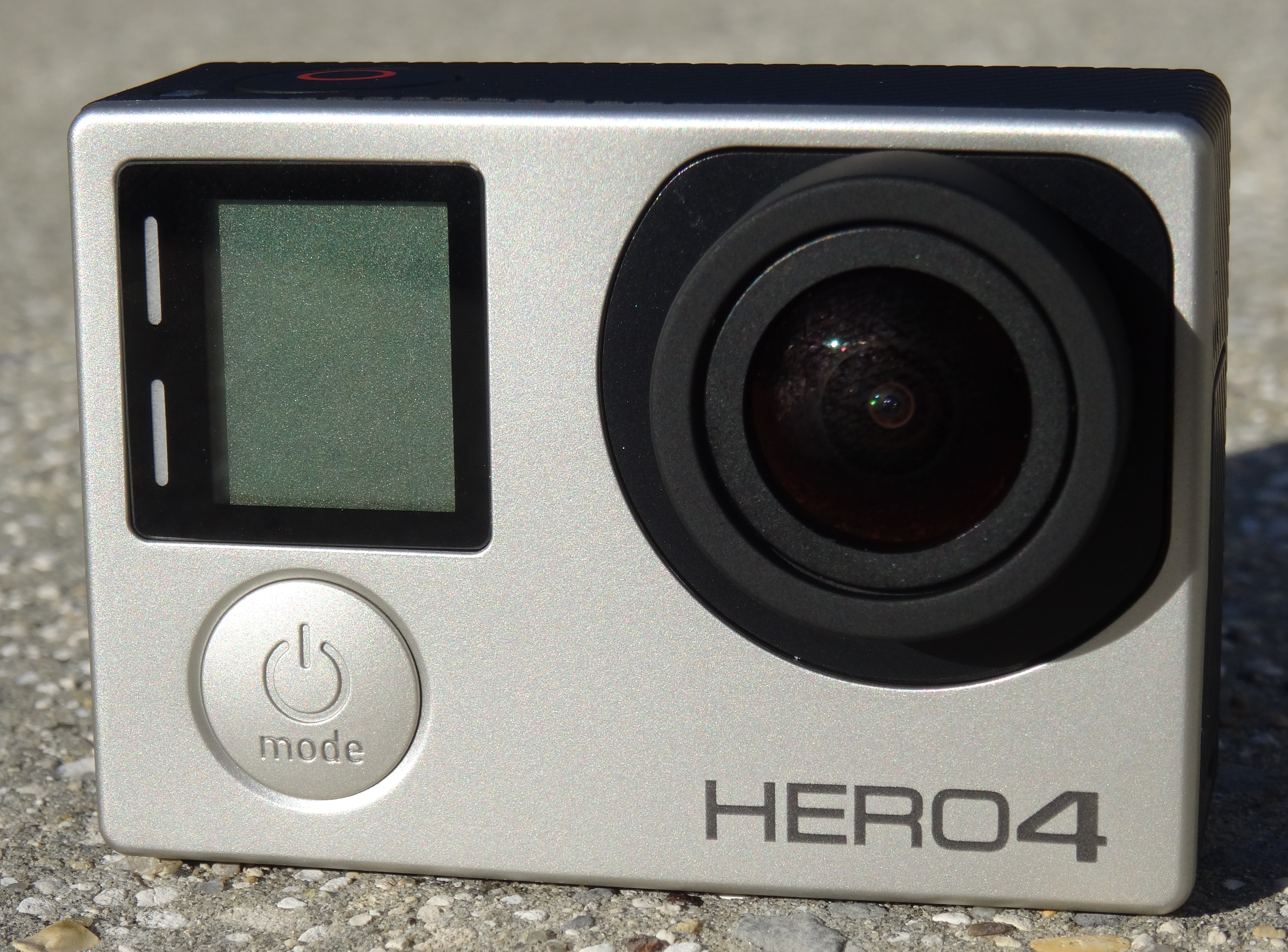
GoPro Hero 4 Silver Edition

In September 2014, GoPro announced the HERO4, available in Black Edition and Silver Edition, which replace their respective HERO3+ generation predecessors. The HERO Session, a budget camera, was also announced.

The HERO4 Black Edition still has a 12-megapixel (MP) CMOS and a fixed maximum aperture of f/2.8 and focus-free. It adds Bluetooth connectivity, Highlight tag, Protune Available for photo and a new processor claimed by GoPro to be twice as fast as that of the HERO3+ Black Edition, doubling the frame rates in most resolutions. The HERO4 Black Edition can record 4K UHD video (3840×2160) at a frame rate of 24, 25 and 30 fps. In Superview mode, 4K is only possible at 25 fps. Many other rates and resolutions are available. The HERO4 Black Edition still shoots stills at a maximum of 12 MP with a maximum burst rate of 30 fps. With Wi-Fi disabled at 4K/30, GoPro claims the HERO4 Black Edition battery life to be 65 minutes, increasing to a maximum of 1 h 50 min at 720p/240. The HERO4 Black battery is in a different form factor than its predecessors. Initial side-by-side comparisons of HERO3+ and HERO4 Black edition video results suggest that the newer model has more detail at long range and similar performance at close range.

The HERO4 Silver Edition is basically a HERO3 Black Edition with the addition of a micro speaker, built-in touchscreen display, Protune for photo and highlight tag (the first GoPro with this), a lower clocked Cortex-A9 and missing the Black Edition's integrated analog-to-digital converter, which supports a wider variety of professional low-sensitivity external microphones. The video modes supported by the HERO4 Silver Edition are similar to those of the HERO3+ Black, due to the higher processing speed and thermal requirements of encoding 4K video (3840×2160), but it supports Wi-Fi, Bluetooth and contains the same Ambarella Inc. A9 system on a chip (SoC) as in the HERO4 Black.

The HERO4 models maintain the H.264 video codec of previous versions and MP4 file formats. GoPro claims the mono microphone in both the Black and Silver Editions has twice the dynamic range of that in the HERO3+, and that the HERO4 Black and Silver Editions have improved low-light performance.

Model	HERO Session	HERO4 Silver	HERO4 Black
Sensor Size	1/3.2 in	1/2.3 in	
Aperture	f/2.8	f/2.8	
Dimensions	38 mm × 38 mm × 38 mm (1.5 in × 1.5 in × 1.5 in)	59 mm × 41 mm × 30 mm (2.3 in × 1.6 in × 1.2 in)	
Weight	74 g	83 g (147 g with case)	88 g (152 g with case)
Video Modes	1440p30, 1080p60, 720p100, 480p120	4k15, 2.7k30, 1080p60, 720p120, 480p240	4k30, 2.7k60, 1440p80, 1080p120, 720p240
Video Formats	MP4 (H.264)		
Stabilization	no		
Loop Recording	yes		
Still Image Resolution	8 MP	12 MP	
Photo burst	10 fps	30 fps	
Connectivity	Wi-Fi, Bluetooth		
Battery	built-in 1000 mAh, Li-Ion	replaceable 1160 mAh, Li-Ion	
Wired Connectors	Micro USB	Mini USB, Micro HDMI	
Water Resistance	10 m	40 m (with case)	
Touchscreen	no	1.5 inches (38 mm) 320×240	optional extra
Audio Port	no		
Launch Price (USD)	$399 (Later reduced to $299, then $199)	$399	$499

===== HERO (2014) =====
In September 2014, GoPro released an entry-level camera named simply "HERO", priced at $130, alongside the HERO4 Black and HERO4 Silver. It is built into a waterproof housing, unlike the HERO4 line.

The GoPro HERO (2014) can capture 5 MP still images and has a 5 fps burst option. It is able to record 1080p at 30 or 25 fps and 720p at 60 or 50 fps on to a MicroSD card up to 32 GB. It has an LCD non touch display on the front and is waterproof down to 40 m (130 ft).

===== HERO+LCD =====
In June 2015, the company started to sell the GoPro HERO+LCD, which provides video recording at 1080p at 60 fps and 8-megapixel photos. The HERO+LCD is also built into a waterproof housing.

GoPro HERO+LCD has a touchscreen to preview the shot to frame the scene and letting the user navigate the menu. A new feature in the camera was instant camera editing. GoPro HERO+LCD is waterproof, because it is built directly into a waterproof case (waterproof to 131 ft or 40 m). The device also includes a feature HiLight Tagging and built-in video editing function, which allows the user to put a label on the main points while shooting video or in the process of view, which makes it possible to quickly find desired footage later. It also has built-in Wi-Fi and Bluetooth, and user-friendly modes like QuikCapture, SuperView and Auto Low Light.

===== HERO Session =====
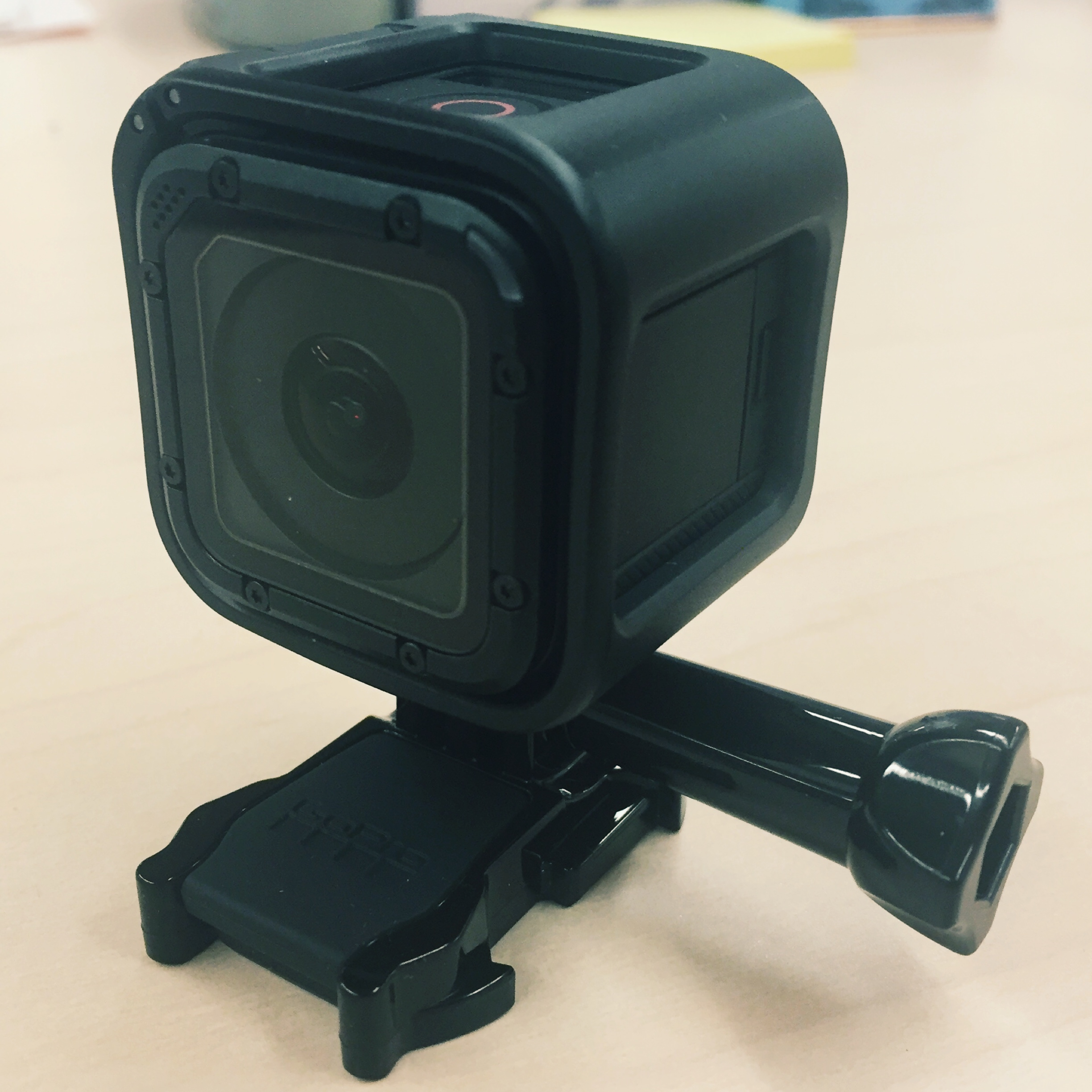
HERO Session

The HERO Session, released July 6, 2015, is 50% smaller and 40% lighter compared to other versions of the GoPro HERO4 camera.

===== HERO+ =====
In October 2015, GoPro released its third entry level camera: GoPro HERO+. This camera is the same as the previous HERO+LCD with its 1080p 60 fps / 720p 60 fps video resolution, 8 MP / 5 fps burst photo resolution, built-in Wi-Fi and Bluetooth, waterproof up to 40 m and other modes like Superview, Auto Low Light, QuikCapture and Timelapse mode which automatically captures photos at set time intervals from 0.5 to 60 seconds. However, it does not have an LCD built-in touchscreen display and it is slightly lighter than HERO+LCD. The HERO+ weighs 123 g whereas the HERO+LCD weighs 127 g. The housing also remained the same.

==== HERO5 ====
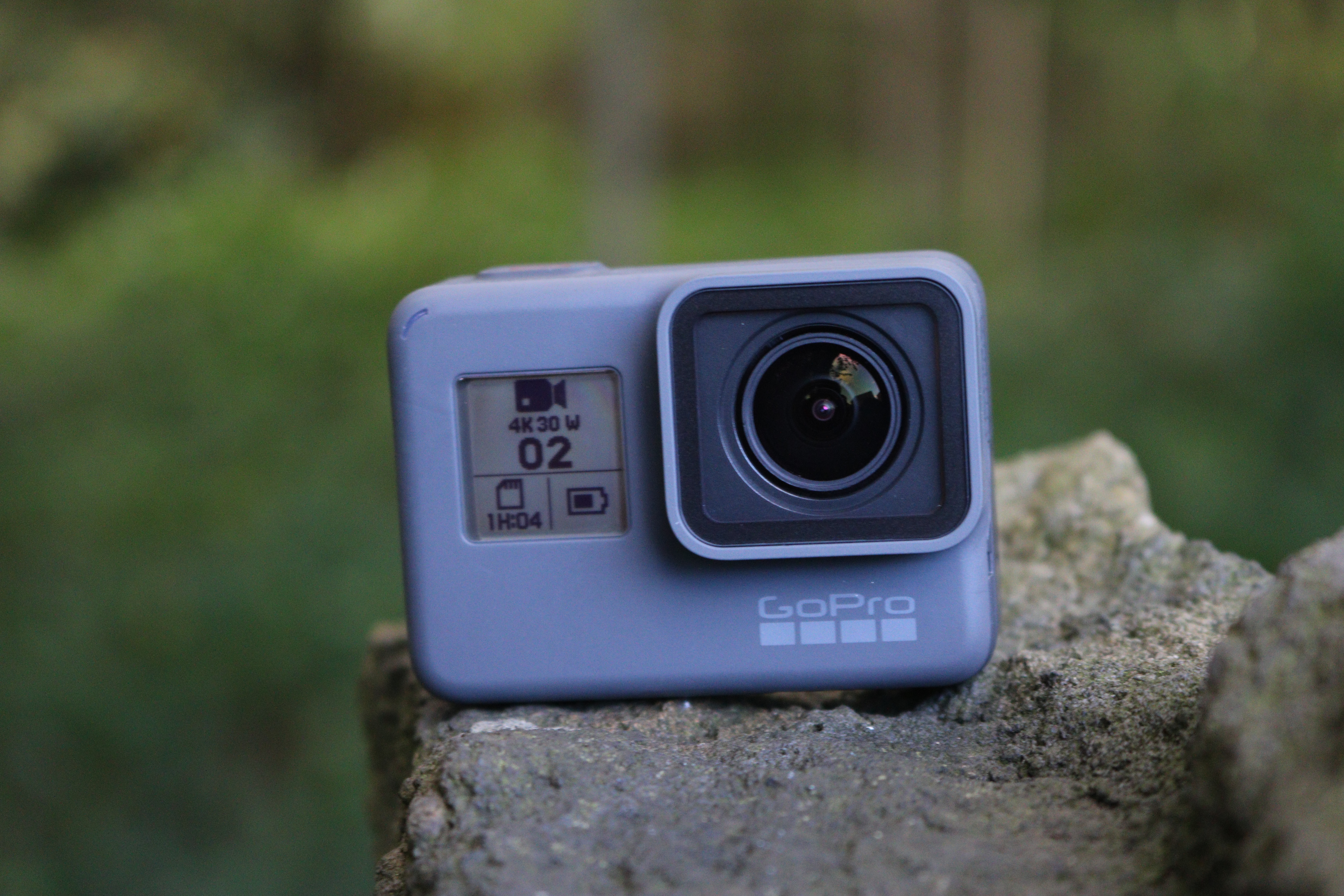
A GoPro Hero 5 Action Camera. Powered on, not recording

HERO5 Black and HERO5 Session were introduced in September 2016. They are waterproof up to 10 m, support 4K video recording at up to 30 fps and 1080p at up to 120 fps, automatic upload of footage to cloud and voice controls.

Model	HERO5 Session	HERO5 Black
Sensor Size	1/3.2 in	1/2.3 in, Sony IMX117
Aperture	f/2.8	f/2.8
Dimensions	38 mm × 38 mm × 36 mm	62 mm × 45 mm × 33 mm
Weight	73 g	118 g
Video Modes	4k30, 2.7k30, 1920×1440 @ 60p, 1080p90	4k30, 2.7k60, 1080p120, 720p240
Video Formats	MP4 (H.264)	MP4 (H.264)
Maximum Video Bit Rate		60 Mbit/s
Stabilization	yes	yes
Loop Recording	yes	yes
Still Image Resolution	10 MP	12 MP
Photo burst	30 fps	30 fps
Connectivity	Wi-Fi, Bluetooth	Wi-Fi, Bluetooth, GPS
Battery	built-in 1000 mAh, Li-Ion	replaceable 1220 mAh, Li-Ion
Wired Connectors	USB-C	USB-C, micro HDMI
Water Resistance	10 m	10 m
Touchscreen	no	yes
Audio Port	no	no
Launch Price (USD)	$299	$399

==== HERO6 ====
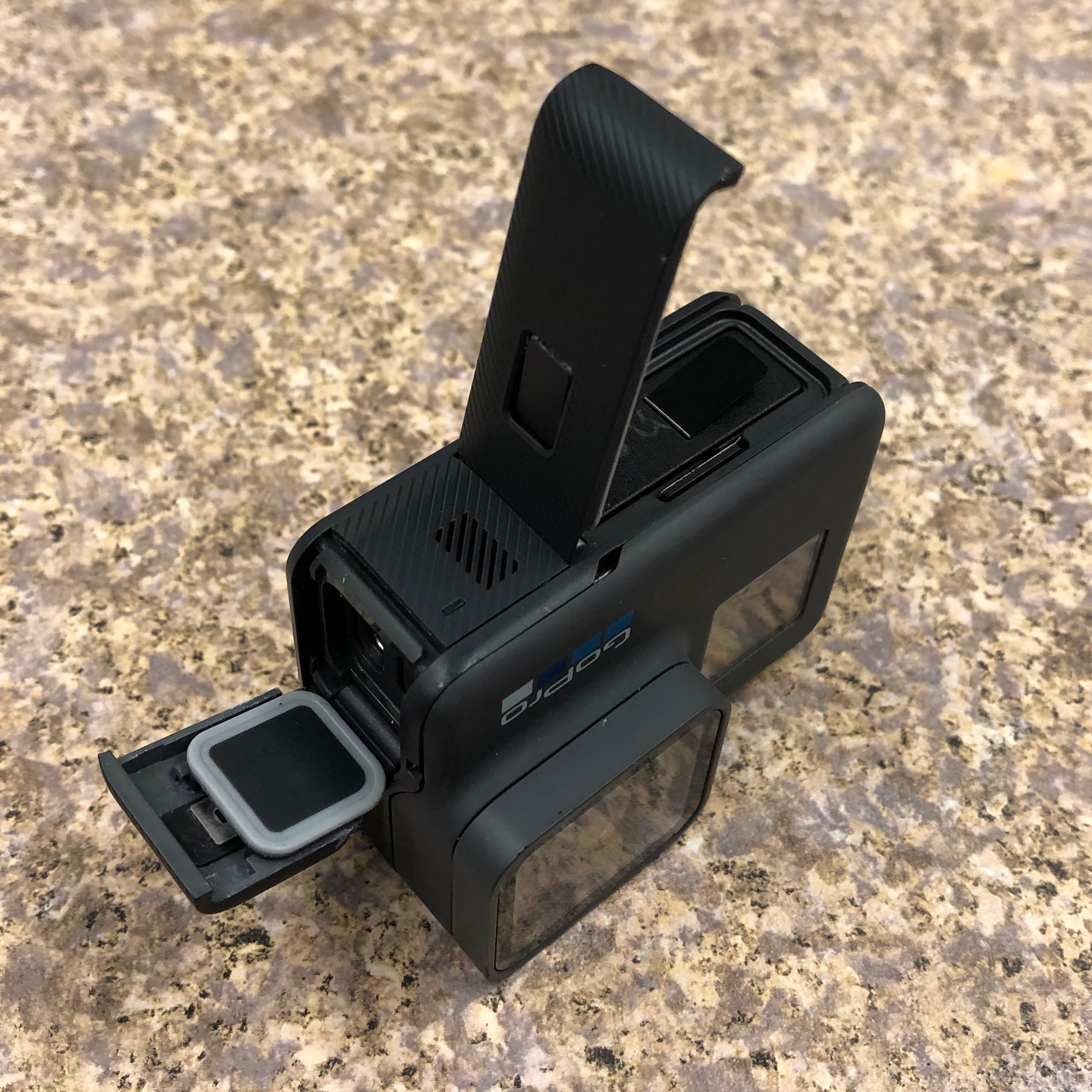
Opened HERO6 Black

The HERO6 Black was introduced on September 28, 2017. The camera is waterproof up to 10 m, supports 4K HEVC video recording at up to 60 fps and 1080p at up to 240 fps, automatic upload of footage to cloud, voice controls and 5 GHz Wi-Fi. It was the first GoPro sporting GoPro's custom SoC the GP1.

Model	HERO6 Black	Hero (2018 edition)
Sensor Size	1/2.3 in, Sony IMX277	1/2.3 in
Aperture	f/2.8	f/2.8
Dimensions	65 mm × 45 mm × 35 mm	
Weight	117 g	
Video Modes	4k60, 2.7k120, 1080p240	1920×1440 4:3 @ 60p, 1080p60 16:9
Video Formats	MP4 (H.264 / H.265)	MP4 (H.264)
Maximum Video Bit Rate	60 Mbit/s	
Stabilization	yes	
Loop Recording	yes	no
Still Image Resolution	12 MP	10 MP
Photo burst	30 fps	10 fps
Connectivity	5 GHz/2.4 GHz Wi-Fi, Bluetooth, GPS	2.4 GHz Wi-Fi, Bluetooth, no GPS
Battery	replaceable 1220 mAh, Li-Ion	Removable 1220 mAh, Li-Ion
Wired Connectors	USB-C, micro HDMI	
Water Resistance	10 m	33 ft (10 m)
Touchscreen	yes	
Audio Port	no	
Launch Price (USD)	$399	$199

===== HERO (2018) =====
The HERO (2018 edition) was announced on March 29, 2018 intended as an entry-level camera alongside the HERO6 Black. The new model offers some similar features and functionality to the HERO5 Black and HERO6 Black, including a touchscreen and built-in time-lapse video mode, but with slightly lower resolution and frame-rate, and lacking the GPS functionality and exposure control; because the hardware is identical to that of the HERO5, the firmware can be modified to include the GoPro HERO5 Black's capabilities.

==== HERO7 ====
The HERO7 White, HERO7 Silver and HERO7 Black were announced and released in September 2018, as the seventh-generation action camera series from GoPro.

The HERO7 White was intended as the entry-level camera, featuring only 1440p resolutions for video and time-lapse video functions and a lack of WDR or HDR in its photos. The HERO7 Silver was intended as the mid-range camera, featuring 4K resolutions for video and time-lapse video resolutions and WDR in its photo mode. Initially, both the HERO7 White and Silver defaulted to a video resolution of 1440p with 1080p only available by cropping. This was met with considerable criticism, of which GoPro responded by releasing software updates to both cameras to allow for change in default resolution to 1080p. The HERO7 White and Silver use a Qualcomm Snapdragon 624 image processor and use a firmware based on Android. In contrast to the HERO7 Black, these cameras lacked most time-lapse photo modes, ProTune, wake-on-voice capabilities, H.265 formats and live-streaming.

By contrast, the HERO7 Black was introduced at the high-end level and primarily encompasses the features of the HERO6 Black with major improvements. The HERO7 Black introduced a heavily improved electronic image stabilisation known as "HyperSmooth" video stabilization, which GoPro has advertised heavily as "Gimbal-Like", as its primary improvement. This feature has resulted in a new time-lapse video feature known as "TimeWarp", essentially a hyperlapse mode, although the original time-lapse video mode continues to remain. The HERO7 Black also introduced a live-streaming feature that would live-stream content, in 720p, directly from the HERO7 Black to the user's social media account, provided the user keeps a nearby internet-connected device.

On February 28, 2019, GoPro released HERO7 Black in a new "dusk white" color. This is a limited edition and it has the same specs as in regular version and differs just in color.

Model	HERO7 White	HERO7 Silver	HERO7 Black
Sensor size	1/2.3 in, Sony IMX458	1/2.3 in, Sony IMX458	1/2.3 in, Sony IMX277
Aperture	f/2.8	f/2.8	f/2.8
Dimensions	62.3 mm × 44.9 mm × 28.3 mm	62.3 mm × 44.9 mm × 28.3 mm	62.3 mm × 44.9 mm × 33 mm
Weight	92.4 g	94.4 g	116 g
Video modes	1440p60, 1080p60	4k30, 1440p60, 1080p60	4k60, 2.7k120, 1440p120, 1080p240
Video formats	MP4 (H.264)	MP4 (H.264)	MP4 (H.264 / H.265)
Maximum Video Bit Rate	?	80 Mbit/s	80 Mbit/s
Stabilization	Standard	Standard	HyperSmooth
Loop recording	No	No	Yes
Live streaming	No	No	Yes
TimeWarp Video	No	No	Yes
Still image resolution	10 MP	10 MP	12 MP
Photo burst	15 fps	15 fps	30 fps
Connectivity	Wi-Fi, Bluetooth	Wi-Fi, Bluetooth, GPS	Wi-Fi, Bluetooth, GPS
Battery	Built-in	Built-in	Removable 1220 mAh, Li-Ion
Water resistance	33 ft (10 m)	33 ft (10 m)	33 ft (10 m)
Touchscreen	Yes	Yes	Yes
Audio port	No	No	No
Launch price (USD)	$199	$299	$399

==== HERO8 ====
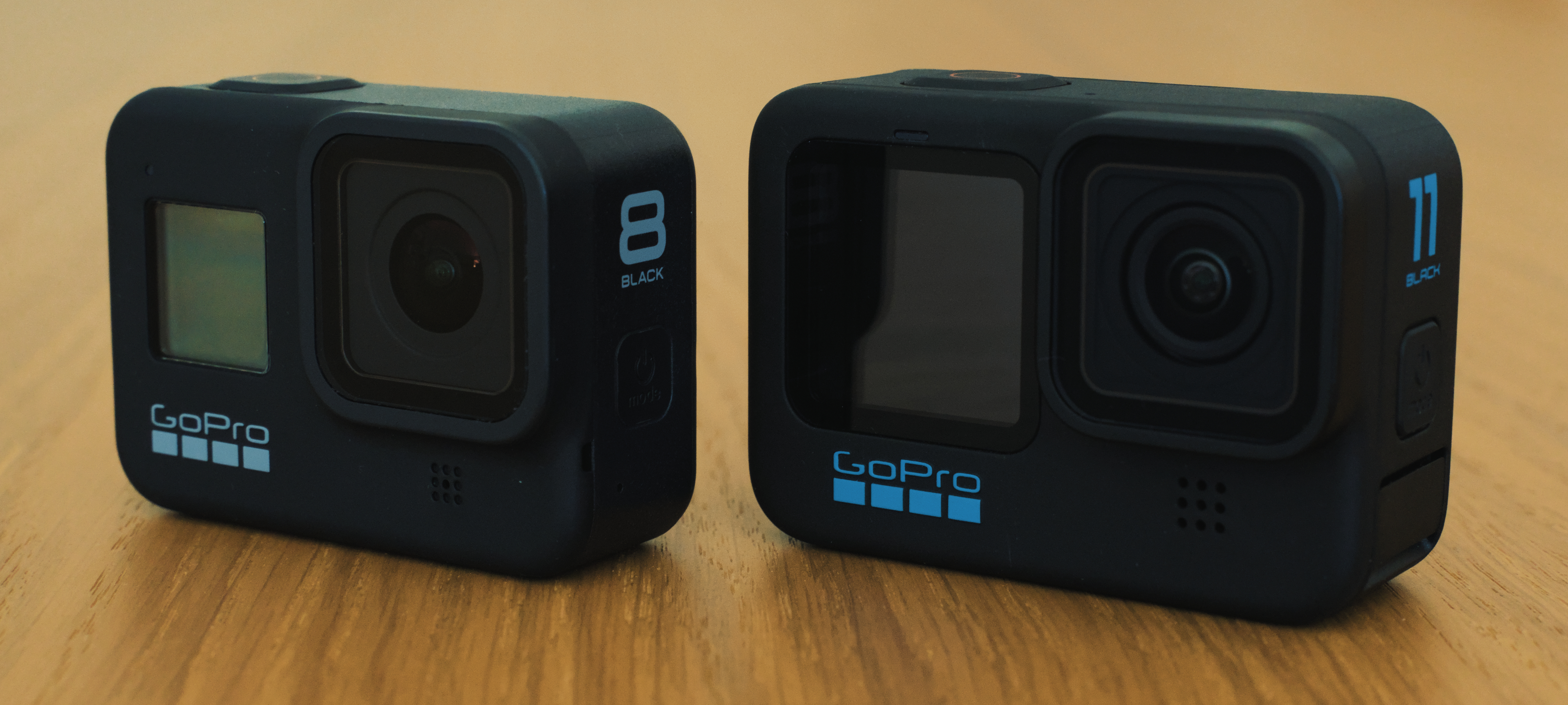
HERO8 Black (left) beside HERO11 Black (right)

The HERO8 Black was announced as the successor to the HERO7 Black on October 1, 2019, alongside the GoPro MAX that offered 360 degree capture.

The HERO8 Black essentially contained the features of the HERO7 Black, and improved on certain functions. Most notably, the "HyperSmooth" feature introduced in the HERO7 Black was improved on and named "HyperSmooth 2.0", also resulting in an improvement of the TimeWarp feature introduced in the HERO7 Black. The HERO8 Black also improved the image quality, improving the HDR functions of the camera to allow HDR to assist the SuperPhoto function of the camera that automatically chooses what image processing to use such as high dynamic range (HDR). GoPro also reintroduced the field-of-view (FOV) functionality as, "Digital Lenses" which retains the original SuperView, Wide, Narrow, Linear FOV settings. Moreover, live-streaming now streams in 1080p instead of the HERO7 Black's 720p and the RAW imaging functionality has now been expanded for all photo modes.

The HERO8 Black largely introduced several new functions into the camera. Physically, the HERO8 Black now incorporates the connecting prongs that are used to connect accessories, directly onto the camera. Originally, the cameras would only be able to access the prongs if the cameras utilised either the frames (for cameras HERO5 to HERO7) or the protective cases for HERO4 and before. Moreover, the GoPro logo moved under the LCD screen to make way for extra microphones. More additions to the camera most notably were part of the software aspects of the camera. These included an option to switch between various settings presets, including standard, activity, cinematic and action shots and adjusting on-screen shortcuts of the user interface. Most notably as part of software, was the introduction of the night-lapse video, which similar to the time-lapse video mode, automatically stitches the frames captured by the camera at set intervals, however with the addition of improved low-light performance.

The HERO8 Black also attempts to address vloggers who may wish to use the GoPro in such a manner. As such, GoPro has also introduced an external accessory known as the "Media Mod" which includes a USB Type-C port for supplying power to external microphones and accessories, a micro-HDMI port and a 3.5 mm microphone port. Moreover, the accessory includes a mount to connect either external microphones, LEDs or an LCD screen.

Model	HERO8 Black
Sensor Size	1/2.3 in, Sony IMX277
Aperture	f/2.8
Dimensions	66.3 mm × 48.6 mm × 28.4 mm
Weight	126 g
Video Modes	4k60, 2.7k120, 1440p120, 1080p240
Video Formats	MP4 (H.264 / H.265)
Maximum Video Bit Rate	100 Mbit/s
Stabilization	HyperSmooth 2.0
Loop Recording	Yes
Live Streaming	Yes
TimeWarp Video	Yes
Still Image Resolution	12 MP
Photo burst	30 fps
Connectivity	Wi-Fi, Bluetooth, GPS
Battery	Removable 1220 mAh, Li-Ion
Water Resistance	33 ft (10 m)
Touchscreen	Yes
Audio Port	No
Launch Price (USD)	$399

==== HERO9 ====
The HERO9 Black was announced as the successor to the HERO8 Black on September 1, 2020.

The HERO9 Black essentially contained the features of the HERO8 Black, and improved on certain functions. Most notably, the "HyperSmooth" feature introduced in the HERO7 Black and refined in HERO8 Black was improved on and named "HyperSmooth 3.0". It also features a max resolution of 5K for video and 20 MP for photos and adds a front-facing 1.4-inch color "selfie" screen.

The HERO9 is slightly bigger than other models.

Model	HERO9 Black
Sensor Size	1/2.3 in, Sony IMX677
Aperture	f/2.5
Dimensions	71 mm × 55 mm × 33.6 mm
Weight	158 g
Video Modes	5k30, 4k60, 2.7k120, 1440p120, 1080p240
Video Formats	MP4 (H.264 / H.265)
Maximum Video Bit Rate	100 Mbit/s
Stabilization	HyperSmooth 3.0
Loop Recording	Yes
Live Streaming	Yes
TimeWarp Video	Yes
Still Image Resolution	20 MP
Photo burst	30 fps
Connectivity	Wi-Fi, Bluetooth, GPS
Battery	Removable 1720 mAh, Li-Ion
Water Resistance	33 ft (10 m)
Touchscreen	Yes
Audio Port	No
Launch Price (USD)	$449 ($349 if purchased direct from GoPro bundled with a 1-year subscription service)

==== HERO10 ====
The HERO10 Black was announced as the successor to the HERO9 Black on September 16, 2021.

The HERO10 Black essentially contained the features of the HERO9 Black, and improved on certain functions. Most notably, the "HyperSmooth" feature introduced in the HERO7 Black and refined in the HERO8 Black was improved on and named "HyperSmooth 4.0". Major changes included a new GP2 processor, the ability to shoot 5.3K video with double the frame rate, 23 MP photos, enhanced low-light performance and HyperSmooth 4.0 video stabilization in all modes.

The HERO10 Black has an identical chassis to the HERO9 Black, and as such, accessories designed for the HERO9 are forwards compatible with the HERO10 and HERO11.

Model	HERO10 Black
Sensor Size	1/2.3 in, Sony IMX677
Processor	GP2
Aperture	f/2.5
Dimensions	71 mm × 55 mm × 33.6 mm
Weight	158 g
Video Modes	5.3k60, 4k120, 2.7k240, 1080p240
Video Formats	MP4 (H.264 / H.265)
Maximum Video Bit Rate	100 Mbit/s
Stabilization	HyperSmooth 4.0
Loop Recording	Yes
Live Streaming	Yes
TimeWarp Video	Yes
Still Image Resolution	23 MP
Photo burst	30 fps
Connectivity	Wi-Fi, Bluetooth, GPS
Battery	Removable 1720 mAh, Li-Ion
Water Resistance	33 ft (10 m)
Touchscreen	Yes
Audio Port	No
Launch Price (USD)	$549 ($449 if purchased directly from GoPro bundled with a 1-year subscription service)

==== HERO11 ====
The HERO11 Black was announced as the successor to the HERO10 Black on September 14, 2022.

Model	HERO11 Black
Sensor Size	1/1.9"
Processor	GP2
Aperture	f/2.5
Dimensions	71.8 mm (W) × 50.8 mm (H) × 33.6 mm (D)
Weight	154 g
Video Modes	5.3k60, 4k120, 2.7k240, 1080p240
Video Formats	MP4 (H.264 / H.265)
Maximum Video Bit Rate	120 Mbit/s
10 Bit Color?	Yes
Stabilization	HyperSmooth 5.0
Loop Recording	Yes
Live Streaming	Yes
TimeWarp Video	Yes
Still Image Resolution	27.13 MP (5568×4872)
Photo burst	30 fps
Connectivity	Wi-Fi, Bluetooth, GPS
Battery	Removable 1720 mAh Enduro, Li-Ion
Water Resistance	33 ft (10 m)
Touchscreen	Yes
Audio Port	3-mics | 3.5 mm Audio Mic Input with Media Mod for HERO11 Black or Pro 3.5 mm Mic Adapter (Sold Separately)

==== HERO12 ====
The HERO12 Black was announced as the successor to the HERO11 Black on September 13, 2023. Most notable difference was the removal of GPS receiver which was a standard feature since Hero6 in top versions of the series, and later reintegrated again in Hero13. Hero12 also came standard with the white casing (as opposed to blue casing in Hero9, 10, and 11) “endurance” batteries.

Model	HERO12 Black
Sensor Size	1/1.9"
Processor	GP2
Aperture	f/2.5
Dimensions	71.8 mm (W) × 50.8 mm (H) × 33.6 mm (D)
Weight	154 g
Video Modes	5.3k60, 4k120, 2.7k240, 1080p240
Video Formats	MP4 (H.264 / H.265)
Maximum Video Bit Rate	120 Mbit/s
10 Bit Color?	Yes
Stabilization	HyperSmooth 6.0
Loop Recording	Yes
Live Streaming	Yes
TimeWarp Video	Yes
Still Image Resolution	27.6 MP active pixels (5599×4927)
Photo burst	Burst Frames/Second: Auto, 60/10, 60/6, 30/6, 30/3, 10/3, 30/1, 10/1, 5/1, 3/1
Connectivity	Wi-Fi, Bluetooth
Battery	Removable 1720 mAh Enduro, Li-Ion
Water Resistance	33 ft (10 m)
Touchscreen	Yes
Audio Port	3-mics | 3.5 mm Audio Mic Input with Media Mod for HERO12 Black or Pro 3.5 mm Mic Adapter (Sold Separately) | RAW Audio Capture (.wav Format) | Wireless Audio

==== HERO13 ====
The HERO13 Black was announced as the successor to the HERO12 Black on September 4, 2024. The camera features a 10% larger battery capacity, Wi-Fi 6 support, 13× burst slo-mo, HLG HDR, and a new Audio Tuning feature, as well as new lens options.

Model	HERO13 Black
Sensor Size	1/1.9"
Processor	GP2
Aperture	f/2.5
Dimensions	71.8 mm (W) × 50.8 mm (H) × 33.6 mm (D)
Weight	154 g
Video Modes	5.3k60, 4k120, 2.7k240, 1080p240, 5.3k120 (Burst), 900p360 (Burst), 720p400 (Burst)
Video Formats	MP4 (H.264 / H.265)
Maximum Video Bit Rate	120 Mbit/s
10 Bit Color?	Yes
Stabilization	HyperSmooth 6.0
Loop Recording	Yes
Live Streaming	Yes
TimeWarp Video	Yes
Still Image Resolution	27.6 MP active pixels (5599×4927)
Photo burst	Burst Frames/Second: Auto, 60/10, 60/6, 30/6, 30/3, 10/3, 30/1, 10/1, 5/1, 3/1
Connectivity	Wi-Fi, Bluetooth, GPS
Battery	Removable 1900 mAh Enduro
Water Resistance	33 ft (10 m)
Touchscreen	Yes
Audio Port	3-mics | 3.5 mm Audio Mic Input with Media Mod for HERO13 Black or Pro 3.5 Mic Adapter (Sold Separately) | RAW Audio Capture (.wav Format) | Wireless Audio

===== HERO (2024) =====
Along with the HERO13 Black, the HERO (2024 edition) was announced on September 4, 2024, as an entry-level model priced at $199.99.

This 4K camera is smaller and lighter than the flagship HERO13 Black, but the aspect ratio is limited to 16:9 for videos and 4:3 for photos; it uses in-app instead of in-camera HyperSmooth stabilization; and has limited shooting modes.

=== MISSION 1 Series ===
The MISSION 1 Series was announced in April 2026 and released on May 28, 2026, as a new line of compact cinema cameras positioned above the HERO line. The series introduced a new 50 MP 1-inch sensor, GoPro's largest to date, paired with a new GP3 processor. A third model, the MISSION 1 Pro ILS, features an interchangeable Micro Four Thirds lens mount and was released in early September 2026.

Model	MISSION 1 Pro	MISSION 1
Sensor Size	1" (50 MP)	
Processor	GP3	
Video Modes	8K60, 4K240, 1080p960	8K30, 4K120
Video Formats	8K30 / 4K120 Open Gate (4:3), MP4	
Photo Resolution	50 MP RAW	
Water Resistance	66 ft (20 m), without housing	
Weight	0.46 lb (209 g)	
Connectivity	Wi-Fi, Bluetooth, USB-C	
Price (MSRP)	$699.99	$599.99

=== GoPro Karma Drone ===
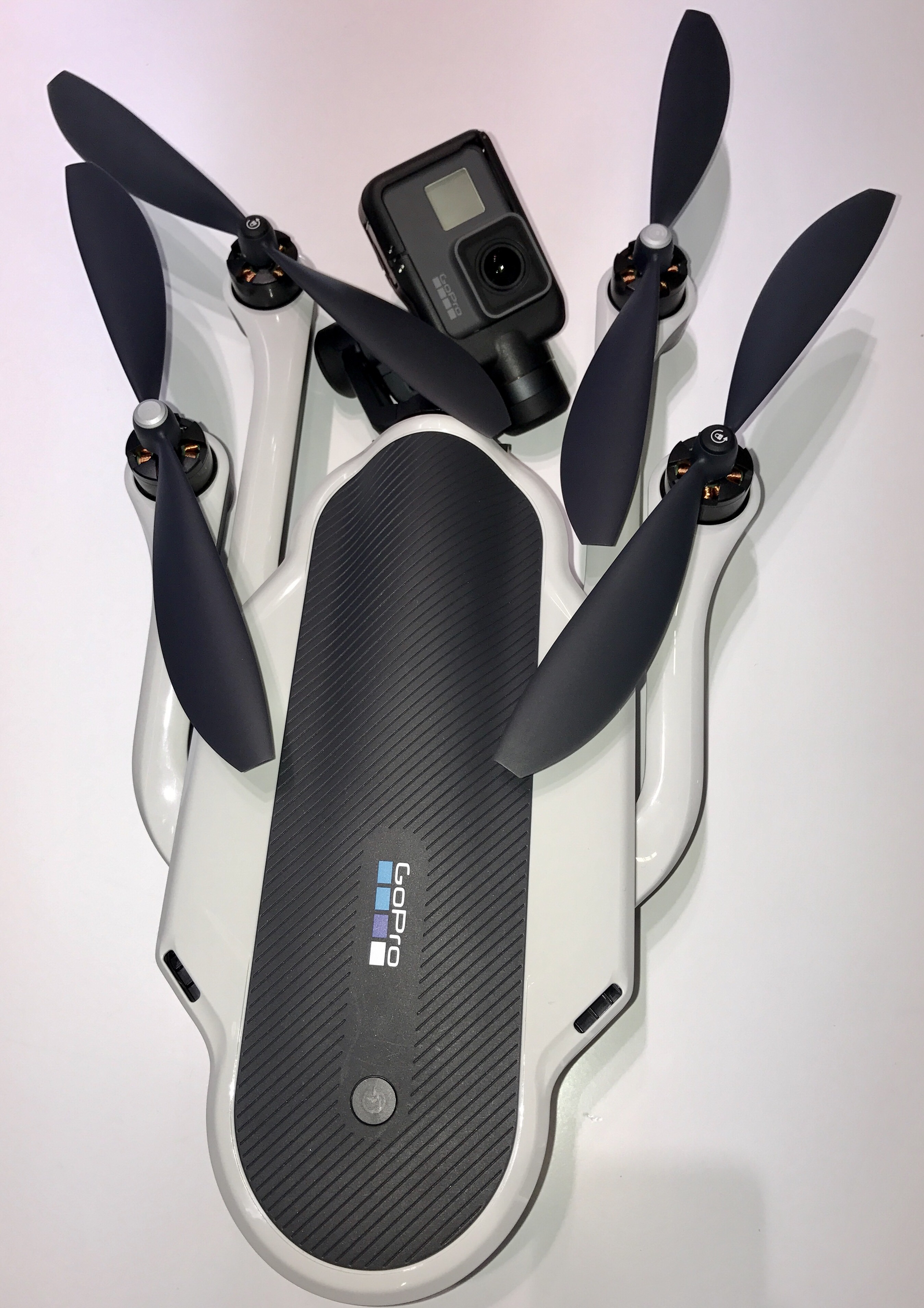
GoPro Karma Drone

Karma Drone became available October 23, 2016. The drone is compatible with the HERO7 Black, HERO6 Black, HERO5 Black and HERO4 Black and Silver. The Drone has 20 minutes of battery life. The stabilizer can be taken out and attached to a Karma grip. The Karma grip has greater than 1-hour battery life.

On November 8, 2016, GoPro announced the recall of the Karma Drone following reports of loss of electrical power on the drone during operation. On February 1, 2017, the company announced that the Karma Drone will return to stores with a redesigned battery latch.

On January 9, 2018, GoPro announced that it was discontinuing the Karma drone and that it was exiting the drone marketplace.

=== Multiple-lens and synchronized cameras ===
==== 3D HERO and Dual HERO ====
GoPro released the 3D HERO system in April 2011, which coupled two HD HERO cameras via a synchronization cable in a single housing to form a stereoscopic 3D camera. One of the cameras is used in upside-down mode. The 3D HERO system is also compatible with the HD HERO2. The synchronized videos are processed using GoPro CineForm software and exported as an anaglyph to be viewed wearing red-cyan glasses.

In 2014, GoPro released an update as the Dual HERO system, which provides similar functionality using two HERO3+ Black edition cameras. The updated Dual HERO BacPac sync/link cable now has an asymmetric design: the right or primary camera (viewed with the lens facing away from the user) is larger than the left (secondary) camera, and the left camera is used in upside-down mode. Like the preceding 3D HERO, the Dual HERO uses CineForm software to process synchronized images and videos for export as anaglyphs.

==== Odyssey ====
The Odyssey is a 16-camera panoramic stereo rig designed to produce content for the Google Jump virtual reality platform by synchronizing the cameras and automatically stitching their footage together. The Odyssey was originally announced at Google I/O in May 2015 and GoPro began taking applications from "professional content creators" in September for the US$15,000 rig, which included 16 GoPro HERO4 Black cameras; limited shipments began in May 2016.

==== Omni ====
The Omni also was announced in May 2015, leveraging its recent acquisition of Kolor, which developed software to stitch video footage together; Omni was a camera rig that synchronizes six GoPro HERO4 Black cameras, allowing users to stitch and make virtual reality 360° videos. Omni began shipping in August 2016.

==== Fusion ====
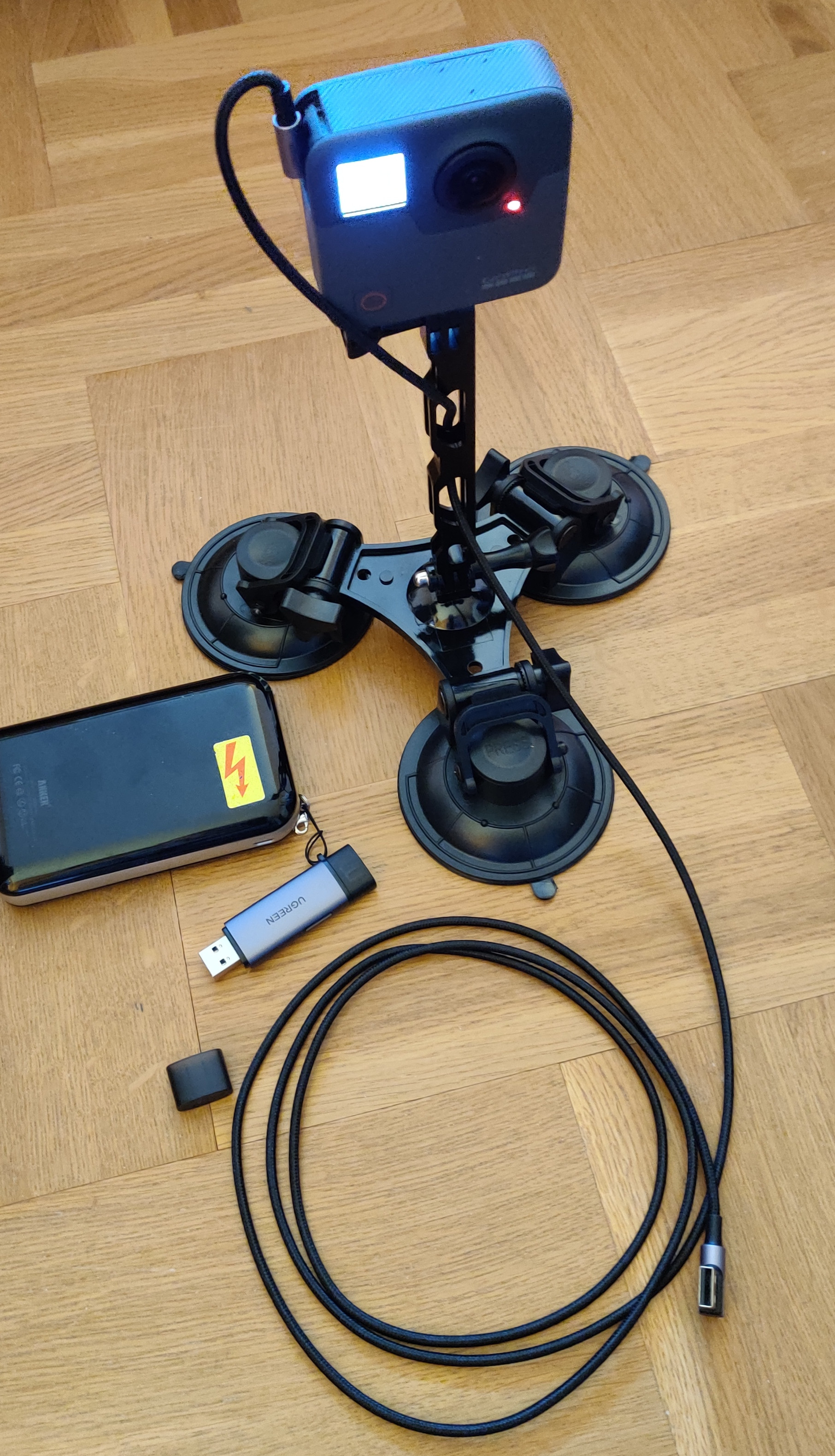
GoPro Fusion

The Fusion was announced alongside the HERO6 Black and released on November 24, 2017. It has two cameras, each recording to a separate microSD memory card; their outputs can be stitched together using the bundled Fusion Studio desktop software as 360° Panorama video. Fusion Studio can export to several formats, including H.264 (4K), CineForm 422, and Apple ProRes 422.

Model	Fusion	Max	MAX 2
Sensor Size	2× 1/2.3 in		
Aperture	2× f/2.8		2x f/1.8
Dimensions	3.5 in × 3.0 in × 1.0 in (89 mm × 76 mm × 25 mm)	2.7 in × 2.5 in × 1.6 in (69 mm × 64 mm × 41 mm)	2.7 in × 2.5 in × 1.9 in (69 mm × 64 mm × 48 mm)
Weight	7.8 oz (220 g)	5.8 oz (160 g)	6.9 oz (200 g)
Video Modes	5.2k30, 3k60 (crop to 1080p/720p using Overcapture)	5.6k30	8k30, 5.6k60, 4k100
Video Formats	MP4 (H.264)	H.264 & H.265 (HEVC)	H.265 (HEVC)
Stabilization	Spherical (via crop)		
Loop Recording	no		
Still Image Resolution	16.6 MP	18 MP	29 MP
Photo burst	30 fps		
Connectivity	Wi-Fi, Bluetooth, GPS		
Battery	replaceable 2620 mAh, Li-Ion	replaceable 1600 mAh, Li-Ion	replaceable 1960 mAh, Li-Ion
Water Resistance	yes, 16 ft (4.9 m)		
Touchscreen	no	yes	
Audio Port	no		
Launch Price (USD)	$699	$499	$499

==== MAX ====
The MAX succeeded the Fusion when it began shipping on October 24, 2019, alongside the HERO8. Compared to the Fusion, MAX records to a single memory card and includes a color touchscreen that allows users to preview video.

==== MAX (2025) ====
A refreshed MAX was unveiled on February 18, 2025. It includes software improvements such as introducing object tracking and additional camera effects via the Quik app. It uses a standard 1/4-20 thread mount, making it compatible with most tripods and sticks, however, most other hardware specifications remain the same as the previous MAX.

==== MAX 2 ====
The MAX 2 was released in September 2025 as the successor of the MAX, notably featuring "true 8K" 360 video recording capabilities without software upscaling, and user-replaceable lenses.

=== Chips ===
Starting from the HERO6 GoPro stopped using Ambarella SoC's and started making their own, starting with the GP1.

==== GoPro GP1 ====
The GoPro GP1 is their own SoC with the main task of image processing. It replaces the earlier used Ambarella SoC's and launched in the GoPro HERO6. The SoC was designed in collaboration with Socionext.

The GP1 encodes video in the H.265 codec, also known as HEVC. The available resolutions are 4k60, 2.7k120 and 1080p240 unstabilized or 4k30, 2.7k60 and 1080p120 digitally stabilized.

==== GoPro GP2 ====
The GoPro GP2 is the second generation SoC. It replaces the earlier used GP1 SoCs and launched in the GoPro HERO10. It is manufactured on TSMC's 12FFC FinFET process.

The GP2 encodes video in the H.265 codec. The available resolutions are 5.3k60 and 4k120 + 2.7k240 Wide FOV.

=== HERO Black (2018-2024) ===
Model	HERO13 Black	HERO12 Black	HERO11 Black	HERO10 Black	HERO9 Black	HERO8 Black	HERO7 Black
Sensor Size	1/1.9"			1/2.3 in, Sony IMX677		1/2.3 in, Sony IMX277	
Processor	GP2				GP1		
Aperture	f/2.5					f/2.8	
Dimensions	71.8 mm (W) × 50.8 mm (H) × 33.6 mm (D)			71 mm × 55 mm × 33.6 mm		66.3 mm × 48.6 mm × 28.4 mm	62.3 mm × 44.9 mm × 33 mm
Weight	159 g	154 g		158 g		126 g	116 g
Video Modes	5.3k60, 4k120, 2.7k240, 1080p240				5k30, 4k60, 2.7k120, 1440p120, 1080p240	4k60, 2.7k120, 1440p120, 1080p240	
Video Formats	MP4 (H.265)	MP4 (H.264 / H.265)					
Maximum Video Bit Rate	120 Mbit/s			100 Mbit/s			80 Mbit/s
10 Bit Color?	Yes			N/A			
Stabilization	HyperSmooth 6.0		HS 5.0	HS 4.0	HS 3.0	HS 2.0	HS
Loop Recording	Yes						
Live Streaming	Yes						
TimeWarp Video	Yes						
Still Image Resolution	27.13 MP (5568×4872)	27.6 MP active pixels (5599×4927)	27.13 MP (5568×4872)	23 MP	20 MP	12 MP	
Photo burst	Burst Frames/Second: Auto, 60/10, 60/6, 30/6, 30/3, 10/3, 30/1, 10/1, 5/1, 3/1		30 fps				
Connectivity	Wi-Fi 6, Bluetooth, GPS	Wi-Fi, Bluetooth	Wi-Fi, Bluetooth, GPS				
Battery	Removable 1900 mAh Enduro, Li-Ion	Removable 1720 mAh Enduro, Li-Ion		Removable 1720 mAh, Li-Ion		Removable 1220 mAh, Li-Ion	
Water Resistance	33 ft (10 m)						
Touchscreen	Rear: 2.27 in Touch Display, Front: 1.4 in Color Display	Yes					
Audio Port	3.5 mm Audio Mic Input with Media Mod for HERO 9B/10B/11B or Pro 3.5 mm Mic Adapter (Sold Separately) | RAW Audio Capture (.wav Format) | Wireless Audio	3.5 mm Audio Mic Input with Media Mod for HERO12 Black or Pro 3.5 mm Mic Adapter (Sold Separately) | RAW Audio Capture (.wav Format) | Wireless Audio	3.5 mm Audio Mic Input with Media Mod for HERO11 Black or Pro 3.5 mm Mic Adapter (Sold Separately)	No			

== See also ==
- Unmanned aerial vehicle (UAV)
- Egocentric vision
- Action camera
