= Olga Zoutendijk =

Dutch businesswoman and banker

- Born: Olga Louise Zoutendijk; 1 March 1961 (age 65); Curaçao
- Citizenship: Dutch
- Education: Thunderbird School of Global Management
- Occupation: business woman

Olga Louise Zoutendijk (born 1 March 1961 in Curacao) is a global business woman and banker. She has held senior executive roles in Asia, Australia, Europe and the United States. In May 2016, Zoutendijk was appointed chair of the Supervisory Board of ABN AMRO Group and ABN AMRO Bank. She became the first woman to be appointed chair of a Supervisory Board of a stock exchange listed company in the history of the Netherlands. On 10 April 2019 she was appointed as a member of the board of directors at Julius Baer Group.

== Early life and education ==
Zoutendijk was born in Curaçao on 1 March 1961 to Dutch parents Prof. Dr. Guus Zoutendijk and Adelheid Zoutendijk-Meijs. In 1963, she moved with her parents to the Netherlands. Zoutendijk received her higher education in the United States. She graduated with a Master of International Management Degree (major: Finance) from Thunderbird School of Global Management in 1985 and a Bachelor of Science Degree in Business Administration from San José State University in 1983. In 1999, Zoutendijk completed the Advanced Management Program (AMP) at INSEAD in Fontainebleau, France.

== Career ==
Olga Zoutendijk began her career in May 1986 in Amsterdam, as a graduate trainee in the International Career Bankers program of ABN, a predecessor of ABN AMRO. In 1988 she relocated to New York City, where she became a client banker covering the U.S. pharmaceutical industry. In 1995, Zoutendijk was appointed head of wholesale banking of ABN AMRO Ireland, based in Dublin. In 1997, she was appointed Deputy CEO of ABN AMRO/BZW Australia and New Zealand, based in Sydney. In 1999, she was appointed CEO of ABN AMRO Portugal, based in Lisbon. In 2001, after a 15-year career with ABN AMRO, Zoutendijk was recruited by Westpac in Australia.

She returned to Sydney to assume the role of Group general manager of Business Banking Products at Westpac. Six months later, Zoutendijk's responsibilities were expanded to include Westpac's Consumer Banking product divisions.

In 2003, Westpac appointed her Group general manager of Corporate & Institutional Banking. In 2007, Zoutendijk was recruited by Standard Chartered Bank as Group Head of the Wholesale Bank across the bank's 22 markets in Asia, initially based in Singapore and then Hong Kong.,

On 1 July 2014, Zoutendijk joined the Supervisory Board of ABN AMRO Group and ABN AMRO Bank and also became a member of the Audit Committee and Risk & Capital Committee.

In February 2015, Zoutendijk relocated from Sydney to Amsterdam in the lead-up to ABN AMRO's initial public offering after the bank's eight-year absence from the stock market. The IPO occurred on 20 November 2015.

Zoutendijk was elected Vice Chairman of the Supervisory Board of ABN AMRO in August 2015 as well as Chairman of the Risk & Capital Committee. In May 2016, Zoutendijk was appointed Chairman of the Supervisory Board of ABN AMRO Group and ABN AMRO Bank.

During her chairmanship of ABN AMRO, Zoutendijk oversaw growth in operating income from €8.5 billion at FYE 2015 to €9.3 billion at FYE 2017, and growth in net profit from €1.9 billion to €2.8 billion./ Zoutendijk also oversaw a near doubling of diversity in the top management layers of the bank from 23 percent to almost 40 percent in 2017.

On 1 July 2016, Zoutendijk was appointed as a member of the board of governors and Chairwoman of the Audit Committee of Leiden University, the oldest university of the Netherlands.

On 5 February 2018, Zoutendijk announced her decision not to opt for a second term effective 1 July 2018, and to transfer her duties as chairman to facilitate the search for a new chairman.

In January 2019, Julius Baer Group, the Swiss multinational private banking group, announced that it would nominate Zoutendijk as a member of its board of directors at the 2019 Annual General Meeting.
