= Rijkman Groenink =

Dutch banker (born 1949)

Rijkman Willem Johan Groenink (born 25 August 1949 in Den Helder) is a Dutch banker. He is best known as the CEO of the Dutch bank ABN AMRO at the time that the bank was sold to a consortium of banks. The consortium was led by the Royal Bank of Scotland, Fortis and Banco Santander in 2007.

== Early career ==
Groenink worked for the bank for 30 years. He studied law at the Utrecht University and has also a Diploma in Business Administration (DipBA) from the Manchester Business School.

In 1974 he joined the bank's predecessor AMRO Bank (Amsterdam-Rotterdam Bank) and he made a quick career within the bank. In 1988 he became a member of the board of directors of the AMRO bank and when the Amro merged with the Algemene Bank Nederland (ABN) in 1990 Groenink became a member of the board of the new group ABN AMRO. In the group's board Groenink was responsible for the division the Netherlands. In May 2001 Groenink was appointed as chair of the board as successor of Jan Kalff.

== Problems in America ==
Late in 2005 the bank became involved in a number of controversies in the United States: over a period of 1 month the bank was involved in a scandal where LaSalle Bank, part of the ABN Amro group, had used funds of their customer to invest in one of their own investment vehicles without the customer's knowledge. In the same month the bank had accepted a settlement of $80 million from the US regulator because they had done business with Libya and they received a fine of $40 million for irregularities with mortgage guarantees using government funds.

== Selling of the bank ==
In 2007 the bank was sold to a consortium of three international banks after a take-over struggle. Groenink preferred a complete takeover by Barclays but the combined share-holders preferred the higher offer from the consortium. As CEO Groenink had built up a substantial portfolio of shares in the bank through various stock option bonuses and the sale of his stake generated an income of €23 million. When Groenink was accused of being an example of the extreme self-enrichment culture in the banking industry, his supporters point out that Groenink preferred a take-over by Barclays and tried to convince the (majority of the) shareholders to accept their offer, even though the cash value of that offer was some 10% lower than the offer from the consortium.

The takeover by the consortium lead to a split-up of the bank. Some international activities, such as ABN's Italian daughter Antonveneta and Brazilian Banco Real would go to the Spanish bank Banco Santander.

The retail and private banking as well as the asset management activities of the bank in the Netherlands would go to the Belgium based bank Fortis while the other international activities would go the RBS.

In the award-winning book "De Prooi" (Dutch: "The Prey") by journalist and professor Jeroen Smit the fall of ABN Amro is described. In the book Rijkman Groenink is described as a detached manager, more concerned with maximizing shareholder value and individual bonuses for the company's leaders than in serving the best interests of the bank's customers. According to the numerous sources in the book, talks with several other banks about mergers failed because of Rijkman Groenink's personal demeanor or his unreasonable demands. At several occasions these demands were related to his own position in a post-merger organisation.

=== Stepping down ===
Groenink had openly defended a takeover by Barclays, so when the consortium RFS won the takeover struggle and declared that they won the bid Groenink stepped down as CEO. As the sale of the bank to RFS was shortly before the Late-2000s recession where governments had to step in and nationalize several banks a big discussion started about the bonus culture in the banking industry.

Groenink received approx. €23 million when he sold his shares in the bank and he received two years' salary as compensation for losing his job. In the press however it was suggested that Groenink received the €23 million as golden handshake or quitting bonus.

== Other activities ==
When Groenink was still with the bank he also held some positions. In 2006 he was rated as the 4th most influential persons in De Volkskrant's annual list of Most Influential Dutchmen. Groenink was appointed in the board of SHV Holdings, Stadsherstel Amsterdam, Flint Holding and several cultural institutions.

=== Board member for Shell ===
In March 2007 Groenink was proposed as new board-member of Royal Dutch Shell as successor of Aarnout Loudon. Shortly after the announcement discussion broke out: people thought that Groenink should concentrate on his role at the bank, especially because a fierce bidding-war had started between the consortium and Barclays. A large stock-holder in both Shell and ABN AMRO, the ABP - the pension fund for all government and education personnel - was against his appointment. The ABP thought that Groenink hadn't worked in the best interests of the shareholders of the bank by defending the Barclays offer instead of the RFS offer. On 14 May 2007 - one day before the AGM Groenink withdrew his availability for the position.

== Life after ABN AMRO ==
After announcing to step down as ABN Amro CEO and not joining the board for Shell, Groenink's ranking on the Top 200 of influential people dropped to 29th place on the 2007 list. With the proceeds of his shares in the bank, Groenink invested in small companies. In the interview/discussion program 'College Tour' of March 2012 he stated that he had lost over a million Euros on his very first investment after stepping down as CEO of the bank, but that he had made some better investments since. One of the markets Groeninks invests in with his private capital is green- or sustainable energy.

Both RBS and Fortis were hit very hard by the 2008 Banking Crisis and the ensuing general financial crisis. In the United Kingdom the government all but nationalized the RBS Group and in Belgium the Dutch and Belgian government had to step in to avoid Fortis going bankrupt. Although the ABN AMRO takeover was not the root cause of these banks' problems it worsened their financial situation and one of the results was that the rebranding of the Dutch parts of ABN Amro to Fortis Bank was reversed: all Dutch activities of Fortis Bank Nederland NV were bought by the Dutch government and as a result the bank was a 100% state owned bank and marketed under the name ABN-Amro.

As Groenink was convinced that he was not responsible for the problems of the bank he offered his services to the owner (the Dutch government) and attempted a return to the bank in 2008.
