= John Rau (business executive) =

American business executive

John Rau (1949/1950–2025) was an American business executive. A four-time CEO, he advised corporate leaders and was the Poling Chair of Business and Government Leadership at Indiana University’s Kelley School of Business.

== Education ==
Rau attended Boston College as an undergraduate. He received a Master of Business Administration from Harvard University, where he was a Goldman Sachs Fellow.

== Career ==
Rau was a chief executive officer four times. At the age of 35, he was the youngest of the top 100 bank presidents in the United States. Rau was CEO of Exchange Bank, selling it to ABN Bank for $450 million in 1989. ABN's LaSalle Bank then appointed him CEO, with Rau stepping down in 1991, but staying on ABN's North America board until it sold LaSalle to Bank of America for $23 billion in 2007.

After LaSalle Bank, Rau became the dean of Indiana University's Kelley School of Business. He was also a visiting scholar at Northwestern University’s Kellogg School of Management from 1992 to 1993, and counsel to the firm of McKinsey & Company.

In 1996, Rau became CEO of Chicago Title & Trust, selling it to Fidelity National in 2000 for a stock-cash value of $1.2 billion. He was CEO of the Chicago-based private investment holding company Miami Corp. from 2002 until his retirement in 2023.

In September 2024, Rau became the Poling Chair of Business and Government Leadership at the Kelley School. He was an 11-time corporate director, including six times as lead or chair, and a Forbes contributor.

Rau died on April 8, 2025 in Bloomington, Indiana, while teaching at the Kelley School. He was 76.

== Publications ==
- Secrets from the Search Firm Files: What It Really Takes to Get Ahead in the Corporate Jungle
