= 2019 E3 Binckbank Classic =

2019 E3 BinckBank Classic
2019 UCI World Tour, race 11 of 38

Race details
- Dates: 29 March 2019
- Stages: 1
- Distance: 203.9 km (126.7 mi)

Results
	Winner	Zdeněk Štybar (CZE)	(Deceuninck–Quick-Step)
	Second	Wout van Aert (BEL)	(Team Jumbo–Visma)
	Third	Greg Van Avermaet (BEL)	(CCC Team)

The 2019 E3 BinckBank Classic is a road cycling one-day race, scheduled to be held on 29 March 2019 in Belgium. It is the 62nd edition of E3 Harelbeke and the eleventh event of the 2019 UCI World Tour.

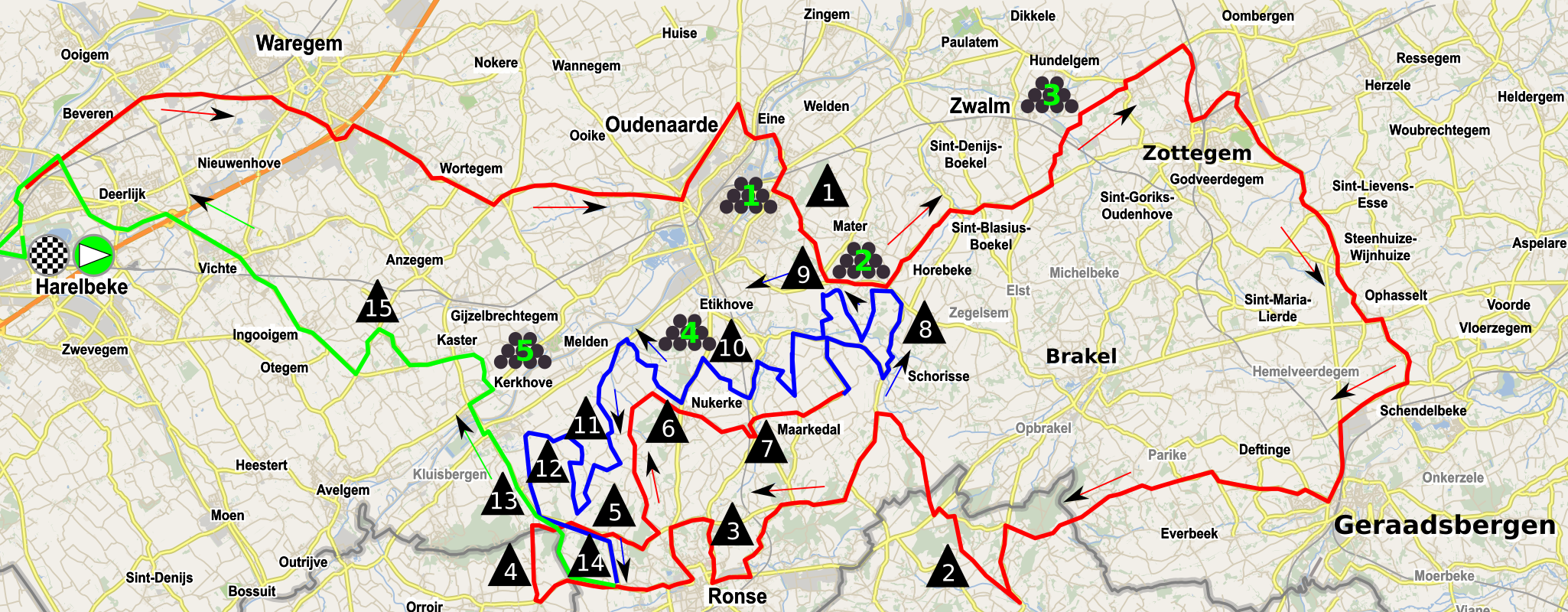
The course of the race

The event was rebranded "E3 BinckBank Classic" due to a sponsorship agreement with Dutch online discount broker BinckBank. However, the race perpetuates its ties with Harelbeke, which continues to host the start and finish. The total distance is 203.9 kilometres (126.7 mi), featuring 15 categorized climbs in the Flemish Ardennes and five flat sectors of cobbled roads. Dutch rider Niki Terpstra won the previous edition in 2018.

== Results ==
Result
Rank	Rider	Team	Time
1	Zdeněk Štybar (CZE)	Deceuninck–Quick-Step	4h 46' 05"
2	Wout van Aert (BEL)	Team Jumbo–Visma	+ 0"
3	Greg Van Avermaet (BEL)	CCC Team	+ 0"
4	Alberto Bettiol (ITA)	EF Education First	+ 0"
5	Bob Jungels (LUX)	Deceuninck–Quick-Step	+ 3"
6	Nils Politt (GER)	Team Katusha–Alpecin	+ 1' 04"
7	Matteo Trentin (ITA)	Mitchelton–BikeExchange	+ 1' 04"
8	Oliver Naesen (BEL)	AG2R La Mondiale	+ 1' 04"
9	Jasha Sütterlin (GER)	Movistar Team	+ 1' 04"
10	Marc Hirschi (SUI)	Team Sunweb	+ 1' 04"
