= BUX (brokerage) =

Amsterdam-based financial services company

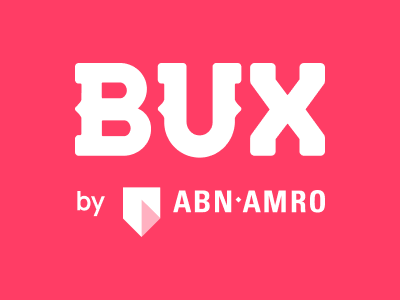
- Type: Private
- Industry: Financial services
- Founded: July 18, 2013; 13 years ago
- Founder: Nick Bortot
- Headquarters: Amsterdam, Netherlands
- Area served: Netherlands,Germany, Austria, France, Belgium, Italy, Spain, Ireland
- Key people: Marlou Jenniskens (CEO)
- Services: Stockbroker; Electronic trading platform
- Number of employees: 100 (2020)
- Parent: ABN AMRO
- Subsidiaries: BUX B.V. BUX Technology B.V.
- Website: bux.com

BUX is a European mobile brokerage company, based in Amsterdam. Retail investors can buy shares and ETFs through the platform. BUX is a subsidiary of ABN AMRO.

== History ==
BUX was founded in July 2013 by Nick Bortot, a former executive at Dutch online broker BinckBank. The initial funding came from the founders and Orange Growth Capital.

The company launched its first BUX app in September 2014 in the Netherlands and several months later in the UK. It was based on CFD trading.

In September 2015, BUX raised €1,700,000 from the American/British venture investor Initial Capital. In February 2016, it raised another US$6,900,000 from Holtzbrinck Ventures, and existing shareholders Orange Growth Capital and Velocity Capital. Also in February 2016, the app became available in Germany.

In 2016 the company won "Accenture Innovation Awards". Also Wired UK included the company into its "Europe's hottest startups 2016" list. In October 2016, the company removed the BUX app from app stores for Belgium just 1 month after launch, due to local law prohibiting the commercialization of leveraged CFDs.

In January 2017, the app was launched in Italy. In October 2017, the firm raised another €10,600,000 from two existing shareholders, Holtzbrinck Ventures and Velocity Capital Management, as well as from a number of private investors (such as Arthur Kosten, the former CMO of Booking.com, BinckBank founder Thierry Schaap and the CEO and founder of Mollie nl:Adriaan Mol). BUX also launched a crowdfunding campaign on Seedrs, where it raised an additional €1,400,000.

By November 2018, the BUX app had 2 million users in 9 European countries.

In May 2019, BUX partnered with ABN AMRO to utilize the bank’s blockchain-based technology for a planned commission-free trading application.

In June 2019, the firm raised US$12,500,000 in venture capital funds. A portion of the capital was used to acquire Ayondo Markets Limited (AML), a UK subsidiary of Singapore-based broker Ayondo, for an estimated £5,700,000.

In September 2019, the company launched its BUX Zero platform in the Netherlands. In June 2020, it was launched in Germany and Austria and one month later in France. In August 2020, it became available in Belgium.

In January 2020, BUX acquired Blockport, a European cryptocurrency exchange. The firm registered it with the Dutch Central Bank, rebranded and launched as BUX Crypto in April 2020.

The Financial Times and Handelsblatt reported that German neobank N26 wanted to acquire BUX for €200 million, but the deal collapsed after N26 pushed for new conditions and a lower price.

In December 2023, it was announced that the company would be acquired by ABN AMRO for an undisclosed amount. In July 2024, it was reported that the transaction had been completed.
