= HSBC Saudi Arabia =

HSBC Saudi Arabia Limited
- Company type: LLC
- Industry: Banking
- Founded: 2005; 21 years ago
- Headquarters: Riyadh, Saudi Arabia
- Products: Investment banking Islamic banking and finance Asset management Capital market
- Number of employees: 300
- Parent: SABB
- Website: www.hsbc.com.sa

HSBC Saudi Arabia Limited is a joint venture between The Saudi British Bank (SABB) and HSBC Holdings plc, established in 2005, as a limited liability company headquartered in Riyadh, Saudi Arabia with a share capital of SAR 50 million (US$13.33 million).

It is the first full-service, independent investment bank to be established in the Kingdom of Saudi Arabia, and serves as HSBC’s investment banking arm in the Kingdom.

The bank provide services in corporate finance, asset management, equity brokerage and security. It employs more than 300 employees. The bank is a component on the Tadawul Exchange.

HSBC Holdings of Britain held 49% stake in the joint venture with SABB holding 51% until October 2019 when HSBC Group acquired shares from SABB to become the major shareholder with 51% stake.

== See also ==
- HSBC Bank Middle East
- Saudi Awwal Bank
- List of companies of Saudi Arabia
