= Bouwfonds =

Rabo Bouwfonds N.V.
- Company type: Subsidiary
- Industry: Real estate
- Founded: 1946; 80 years ago
- Headquarters: Westerdorpsstraat 66; Postbus 15; 3870 DA, Hoevelaken, the Netherlands
- Key people: Tjalling Halbersma, CEO
- Products: Real estate Real Estate Development; Investment Management
- Revenue: ▲€ 574 million (2006)
- Net income: ▲€ 189 million (2006)
- Number of employees: 1487 (2006)
- Parent: Rabobank Groep
- Website: www.bouwfondsim.com

Bouwfonds is an international real estate company and one of the largest in the Netherlands. The company was established in 1946, just after the Second World War, as local government property developer with the aim to help working-class people buy their own home. In 2000 it was sold to ABN Amro. According to a recent report from the Dutch daily De Volkskrant the circumstances under which the privatization took place constitute an economic scandal. As the report claims " (...) Bouwfonds staff leaked documents to ABN Amro CEO Rijkman Groenink. These included confidential details about a bid by ING, allowing ABN Amro to trump the offer.". Since December 2006, Bouwfonds has been part of Rabo Real Estate Group.

== See also ==
- Bouwfonds and Philips pension fund real estate fraud, codenamed as Klimop case by the Dutch ministry of justice and the FIOD.
