= Standard Federal Bank =

Michigan bank

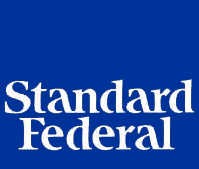
- Industry: Financial Services
- Founded: September 13, 1863
- Defunct: 17 October 2008
- Fate: Absorbed by Bank of America
- Successor: Bank of America N.A.
- Headquarters: Troy, Michigan, United States
- Products: Middle-Market Commercial Lending, Middle-Market Commercial Real Estate Lending, Domestic and International Cash Management Commercial Banking, Wealth Management, Retail Banking, Trust and Treasury
- Parent: Standard Federal Bancorporation; ABN AMRO

Standard Federal Bank was a Troy, Michigan-based bank serving Michigan and Northern Indiana in the United States which was acquired by Bank of America on 5 May 2008.

In 2005, Standard Federal was the largest bank in Michigan based on number of retail branches (265), ATMs (more than 1,000) and deposits (US 23.3B, 15.06% market share); it ranked second in assets.

After ABN AMRO acquired it, the bank was renamed LaSalle Bank Midwest in 2005. Bank of America purchased the bank and its parent LaSalle Bank Corporation on October 1, 2007, and all branches were rebranded Bank of America on May 5, 2008.

== History ==
Standard Federal began as Standard Savings & Loan Association; established on April 25, 1893, assuming the charter of the Workman's Savings and Loan Association. Offices opened in the basement of the old McGraw Building at the corner of Griswold and Lafayette in downtown Detroit. Standard moved to a larger building at the corner of Griswold and Larned Streets in 1914. It purchased land in 1927 and constructed its own headquarters at the northwest corner of Griswold and Jefferson in 1927. This lot was known as "the Cornerstone of Detroit", as it was the site of the first building ever raised in the city: Ste. Anne's Church, built July 26, 1701. In that year assets surpassed $10 million.

"Safety For Savings Since 1893"... an old Standard slogan that was never tested so severely as during the Wall Street crash of 1929 and subsequent Great Depression. It weathered the 1929 stock market crash, and stayed open even as many Detroit banks and thrifts permanently closed after the 1933 bank holiday. The first branch office opened in 1948 on Grand River near Southfield Road in Northwest Detroit.

Standard's name changes over the years reflected growth in its scope and capabilities. After 57 years as Standard Savings & Loan Association, the thrift applied for and received a federal charter in 1950. This expanded its lending powers and Standard became known as Standard Federal Savings & Loan Association. The first branch office outside Detroit city limits opened in 1957 in suburban Royal Oak on North Woodward near 12 Mile Road. Assets meanwhile amounted to $100 million in 1957.

=== Mergers and acquisitions ===
In 1970, Birmingham Federal Savings (Michigan) merged with Standard Federal. Main offices moved to Birmingham on Woodward Avenue near Big Beaver Road. Total assets in 1973 reached $1 billion. In 1973, offices moved to a larger building in Troy at 2401 Big Beaver Road.

It acquired Wayne Federal Savings (Michigan) in 1975 and in 1980 First Federal Savings of Niles (Michigan) merged with Standard Federal. In 1981, it purchased Landmark Savings and Loan (Saginaw/Bay City, Michigan) and First Savings Association of Dowagiac (Michigan).

In the largest merger in Standard Federal's history, it took control of American Federal Savings of Fort Wayne, First Federal Savings of Fort Wayne, Fort Wayne Federal Savings, and South Bend Federal Savings and Loan Association (all of Indiana) in November 1983. The following year, assets totaled $5 billion.

On January 1, 1985, the bank converted from a federally chartered mutual savings and loan association to a federally chartered mutual savings bank and changed its name from Standard Federal Savings and Loan Association to Standard Federal Bank. On August 28, 1986, the bank's board of directors adopted a Plan of Conversion providing for the bank's conversion from a mutual to a stock institution. As of December 31, 1986, Standard Federal had 83 offices in 16 counties in Michigan and Indiana; 78 of which were full-service branches. The conversion from a mutual company to a publicly owned stock company listed on the New York Stock Exchange took place on January 28, 1987. This was one of the largest stock conversions by dollar amount in the history of the thrift industry.

Standard Federal completed the acquisition of Tower Federal Savings Bank of South Bend (Indiana) on June 18, 1988. During 1989, the bank acquired two savings institutions in Michigan: First Federal Savings and Loan Association of Kalamazoo (originally known as the Kalamazoo County Building Loan Association) and Peoples Savings Bank, F.S.B. in Monroe. On September 6, 1991, Standard Federal entered the Ohio market, gaining a significant presence in the northwest Ohio area through the acquisition of United Home Federal Savings and Loan Association of Toledo. It purchased First Federal Savings and Loan Association of Lenawee County, Adrian (Michigan) on August 8, 1992.

On April 25, 1993, Standard Federal celebrated its centennial. The bank stood as the largest thrift institution in the Midwest and the seventh largest in the United States, with assets of approximately $10 billion. In December of the same year, Standard made its largest single acquisition in history – Heritage Federal Savings Bank in Taylor (Michigan). Other acquisitions include InterFirst Bankcorp (1993), Colonial Central Savings Bank (1994) and Fidelity Savings Bank (1996). Effective May 1, 1995, Standard Federal Bank reorganized as Standard Federal Bancorporation, Inc., a holding company.

=== Purchase by ABN AMRO ===
On November 21, 1996, ABN AMRO reached an agreement to purchase Standard Federal Bancorporation for $1.9 billion; the acquisition completed on May 1, 1997. In 1996, Standard Federal was the largest savings bank in the Midwest, and the fourth largest bank in the State of Michigan. At December 31, 1996, Standard Federal's total assets amounted to $15.7 billion, with total deposits of $11.0 billion, loans serviced for others of $10.5 billion and stockholders' equity of $956.8 million.

In 2001, ABN AMRO acquired Michigan National Bank and merged it into Standard Federal. The merged bank adopted the acquired bank's national bank charter and the bank became Standard Federal Bank N.A., closing 59 overlapping branch offices and making Standard Federal Michigan's largest bank by the number of branch offices.

=== Rebranding to LaSalle Bank ===
On September 12, 2005, ABN AMRO and its American subsidiary LaSalle Bank Corporation officially changed the name of Standard Federal Bank N.A. to LaSalle Bank Midwest N.A. in what it called a "brand consolidation" instead of a merger with Chicago-based LaSalle Bank N.A. to pool the two banks' marketing resources.

=== Sale to Bank of America ===
On April 23, 2007, ABN AMRO announced the sale of LaSalle Bank Corporation to Bank of America for $21 billion, and a net sale of $16 billion after the return of $5 billion in excess capital. A consortium led by Royal Bank of Scotland filed a legal challenge to the deal as ABN AMRO did not seek higher bids from other potential purchasers, however, the Dutch Supreme Court ultimately approved the sale. Bank of America closed the purchase on October 1, 2007, and LaSalle Bank Midwest began doing business under the Bank of America brand on May 5, 2008.
