= ABN AMRO =

Dutch bank

ABN AMRO Bank N.V.

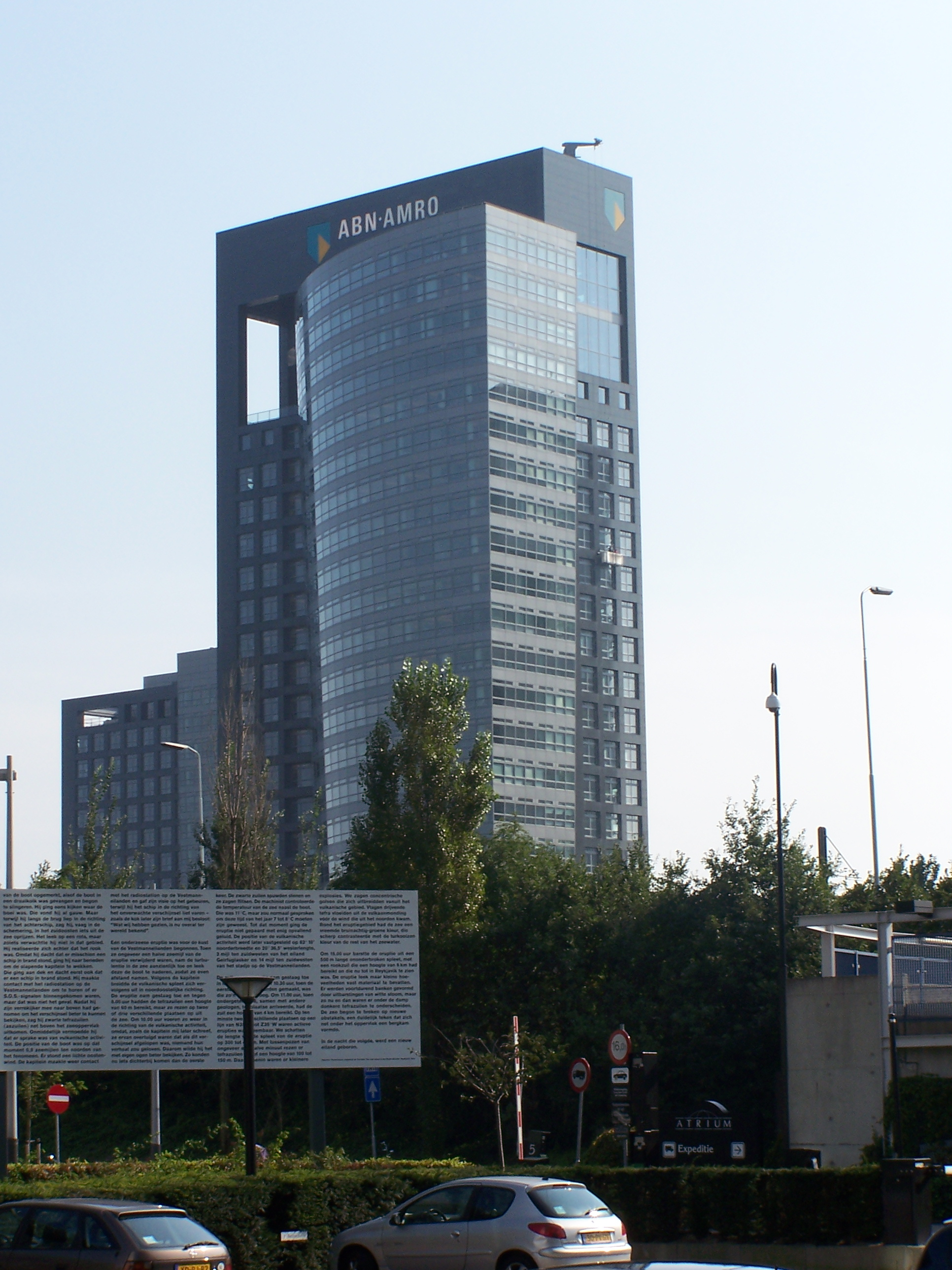
- Type: Public
- Traded as: Euronext Amsterdam: ABN; AEX component
- Industry: Financial services
- Founded: 21 September 1991; 35 years ago
- Headquarters: Amsterdam, Netherlands
- Key people: Marguerite Bérard (CEO)
- Products: Asset management Commercial banking Investment banking Private banking Retail banking
- Revenue: 7,597,000,000 euro (2021)
- Operating income: ▲8.861 billion Euros (2024)
- Net income: ▲2.403 billion Euros (2024)
- AUM: ▲158.4 billion Euros (2022)
- Total assets: ▲€470,037 (Q1 2026)
- Total equity: ▲26.10 billion Euros (2024)
- Number of employees: ▲23,299 (December, 2024)
- Divisions: Retail Banking, Private Banking, Commercial Banking, Corporate & Institutional Banking, Group Functions
- Website: abnamro.com

ABN AMRO Bank N.V. is the third-largest Dutch bank, with headquarters in Amsterdam. It was initially formed in 1991 by merger of the two prior Dutch banks that form its name, Algemene Bank Nederland (ABN) and Amsterdamsche en Rotterdamsche Bank (AMRO Bank).

Following aggressive international expansion, ABN AMRO was acquired and broken up in 2007–2008 by a consortium of European banks, including Fortis which intended to take over its formed operations in the Benelux region. Fortis came under stress in the autumn of 2008, and was in turn broken up into separate national entities; the Dutch operations, namely Fortis Bank Nederland and the former ABN AMRO activities that Fortis had planned to absorb, were nationalized, restructured, and renamed ABN AMRO in mid-2010. On 20 November 2015, the Dutch government publicly re-listed the company through an IPO and sold 20 percent of the shares to the public.

ABN AMRO has been designated as a Significant Institution since the entry into force of European Banking Supervision in late 2014, and as a consequence is directly supervised by the European Central Bank.

== History ==
=== Background ===
In 1824, King William I established the Nederlandsche Handel-Maatschappij (NHM) a trading company to revive trade and financing of the Dutch East Indies and it would become one of the primary ancestors of ABN AMRO. The NHM merged with the Twentsche Bank in 1964, to form Algemene Bank Nederland (ABN). Also in 1964, the Amsterdamsche Bank, established in 1871, merged with the Rotterdamsche Bank, established in 1873 (as part of a merger that included Determeijer Weslingh & Zn. from 1765), to form Amsterdamsche en Rotterdamsche Bank, known as AMRO Bank.

=== ABN and AMRO merger ===
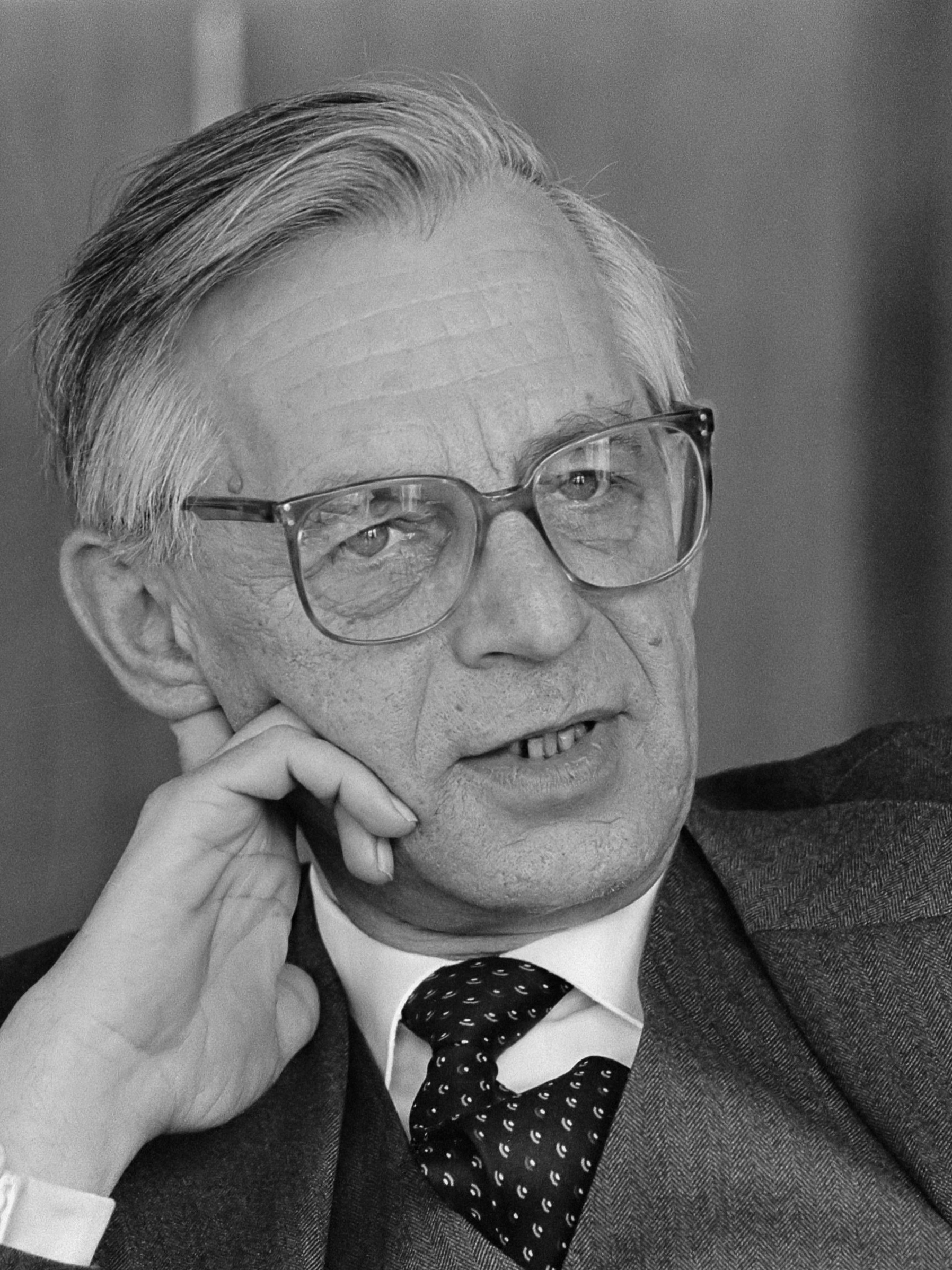
Politician Roelof Nelissen (1931-2019) was instrumental in the merger of ABN and AMRO Bank in 1991

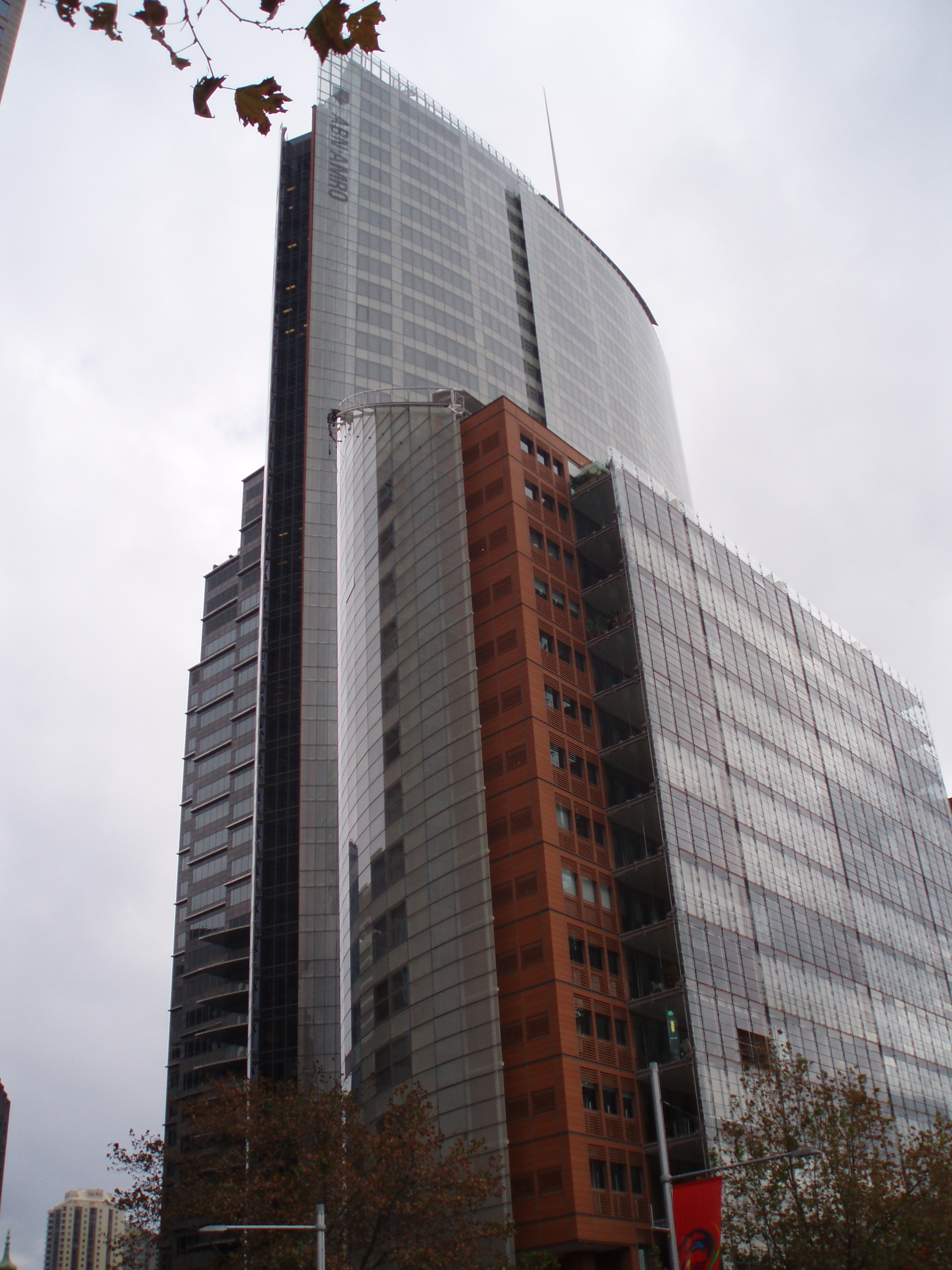
Aurora Place in Sydney displaying the ABN AMRO brand, 2006

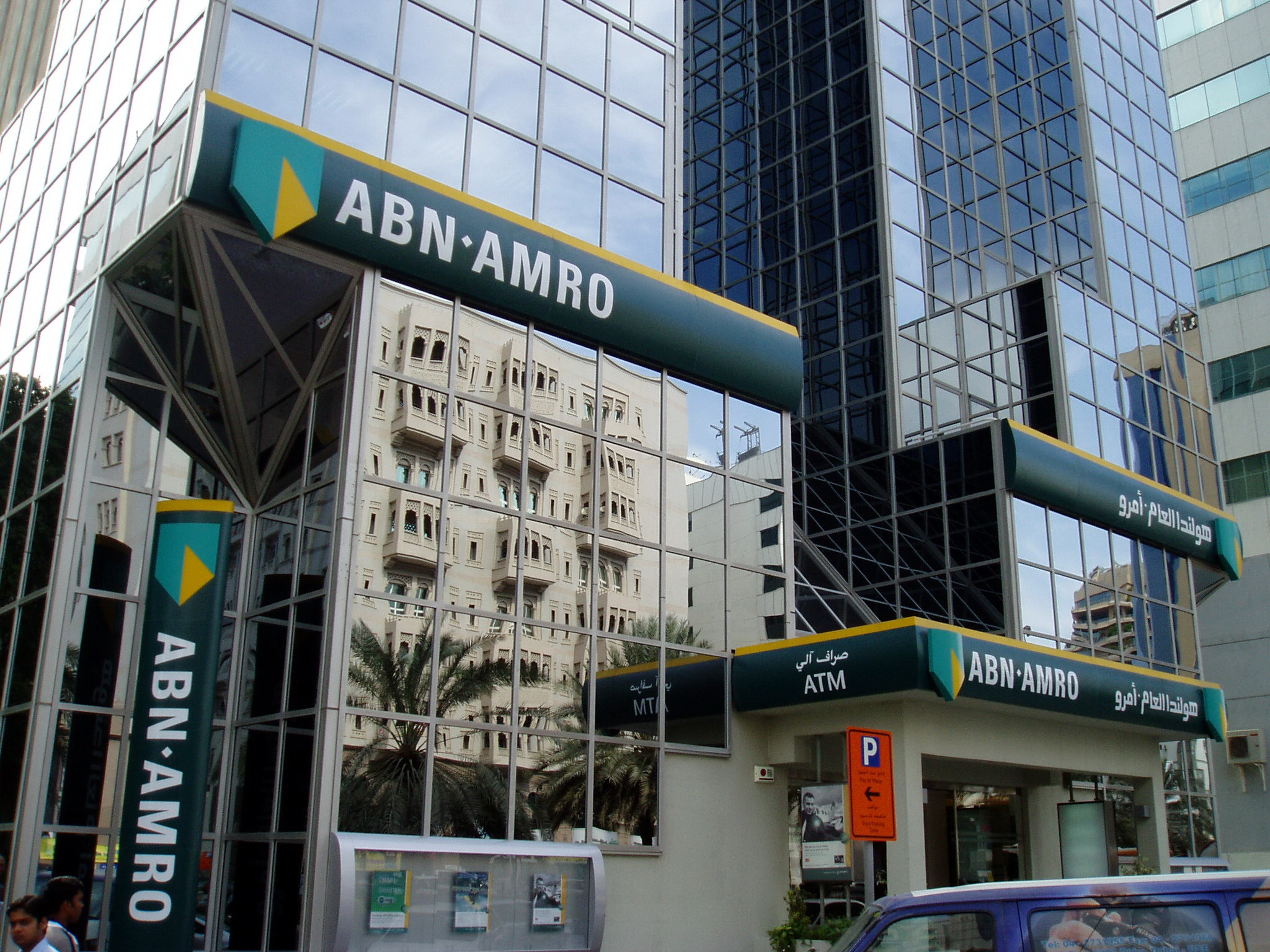
ABN AMRO branch in Dubai, 2008

On 22 September 1991, ABN and AMRO merged to form ABN AMRO. In 1993, two of its investment banking subsidiaries ― Bank Mees & Hope and Pierson, Heldring & Pierson ― merged in turn to form MeesPierson.

The two merged banks brought to ABN AMRO a large network of overseas companies and branches. From NHM, ABN owned a significant branch network in Asia and the Middle East, including the Saudi Hollandi Bank owned by the NHM Jeddah branch. Another, the Hollandsche Bank-Unie (HBU), which grew from the merger of the Hollandsche Bank voor de Middellandsche Zee (HBMZ) and the Hollandsche Zuid-Amerika Bank in 1933, gave ABN AMRO an extensive network of branches in South and Central America. In 1979, ABN had expanded into North America with the acquisition of Chicago-based LaSalle National Bank.

After the 1991 merger, ABN AMRO continued to grow through a number of further acquisitions, including the 1996-purchase of suburban Detroit based Standard Federal Bank followed five-years later by the acquisition of its Detroit-based competitor Michigan National Bank which was rebranded as Standard Federal. In 2005, Standard Federal became LaSalle Bank Midwest to unite ABN AMRO's two banking networks in the U.S. In 1995, ABN AMRO purchased The Chicago Corporation, an American securities and commodities trading and clearing corporation.

Other major acquisitions included the Brazilian bank Banco Real in 1998, and the Italian bank Antonveneta in 2006. It was also involved in the controversial acquisition of the Dutch local government mortgage and building development organisation, the Bouwfonds in 2000. ABN AMRO sold the Bouwfonds as a going concern in 2006.

In July 2006, Favonius Ventures, which was founded and headed by Roel Pieper, received all of the technology investments of ABN AMRO Capital which is the private equity business unit of ABN AMRO Bank N.V.

=== Mid-2000s weakness, acquisition and breakup ===
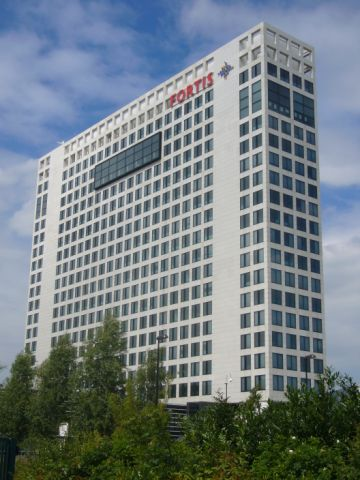
Fortis Bank Nederland head office in Utrecht, 2008

ABN AMRO had come to a crossroads in early 2005. The bank had still not come close to its own target of having a return on equity that would put it among the top five of its peer group, a target that the CEO, Rijkman Groenink had set upon his appointment in 2000. From 2000 until 2005, ABN AMRO's stock price stagnated. Financial results in 2006 added to concerns about the bank's future. Operating expenses increased at a greater rate than operating revenue, and the efficiency ratio deteriorated further to 69.9%. Non-performing loans increased considerably year on year by 192%. Net profits were only boosted by sustained asset sales. In 2006, research findings were publicly released regarding ABN AMRO Bank N.V.'s predecessors and connections to African slavery. An examination of 200 predecessors of ABN AMRO Bank N.V. founded before 1888 determined that some had connections to African slavery, either in the United States or elsewhere in the Americas.

By 2007, ABN AMRO was the second-largest bank in the Netherlands and the eighth-largest in Europe by assets. At that time, the magazine The Banker and Fortune Global 500 placed it 15th in the list of world's biggest banks and it had operations in 63 countries, with over 110,000 employees.

On 31 August 2007, ABN AMRO Bank N.V. Pakistan merged with Prime Commercial Bank which consisted of 69 branches across 24 cities. ABN AMRO Bank (Pakistan) Limited (Which later got merged into Royal Bank of Scotland Pakistan) was formed as the result of the US$227 million acquisition.

On 21 February 2007, The Children's Investment Fund Management (TCI) hedge fund called to ask the Chairman of the Supervisory Board to actively investigate a merger, acquisition, or breakup of ABN AMRO, stating that the current stock price did not reflect the true value of the underlying assets. TCI asked the chairman to put its request on the agenda of the annual shareholders' meeting to be held in April 2007. Events accelerated on 20 March 2007, when the British bank Barclays and ABN AMRO both confirmed they were in exclusive talks about a possible merger.

On 28 March 2007, ABN AMRO published the agenda for the shareholders' meeting of 2007. It included all items requested by TCI, but with the recommendation not to follow the request for a breakup of the company.

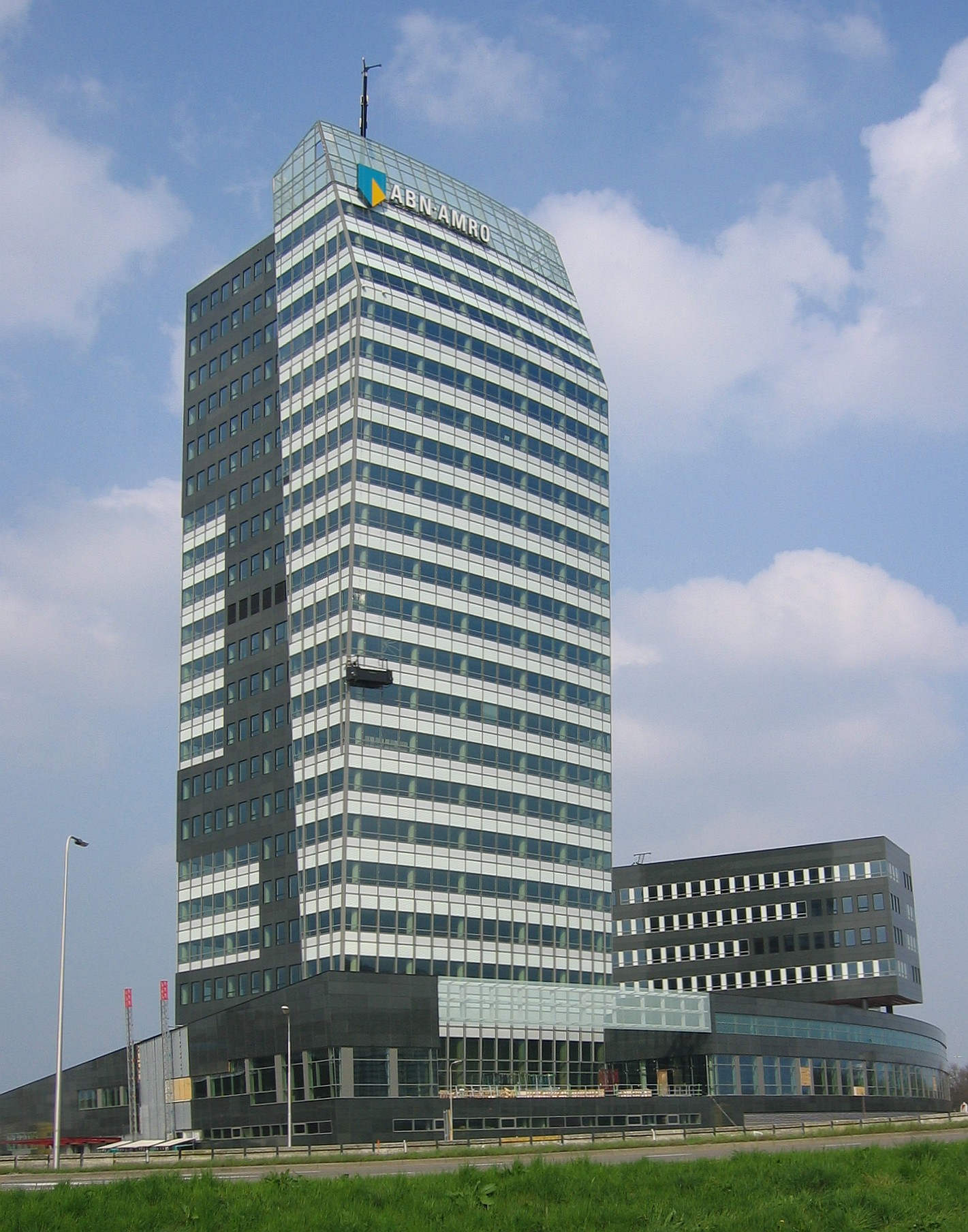
ABN AMRO Insurance headquarters at IJsseltoren in Zwolle

However, on 18 April, another British bank, the Royal Bank of Scotland (RBS) contacted ABN AMRO to propose a deal in which a consortium of banks, including RBS, Belgium's Fortis, and Spain's Banco Santander Central Hispano (now Banco Santander) would jointly bid for ABN AMRO and thereafter divide the components of the company among them. According to the proposed deal, RBS would receive ABN's United States operations, LaSalle, and ABN's wholesale operations; Banco Santander would take the Brazilian operations; and Fortis, the Dutch operations. The three banks set up a joint venture, RFS Holdings (with a name based on their respective initials), to execute the transaction.

On 23 April, ABN AMRO and Barclays announced the proposed acquisition of ABN AMRO by Barclays. The deal was valued at €67 billion and included the sale of LaSalle Bank to Bank of America for €21 billion.

Two days later, the RBS-led consortium brought out its indicative offer, worth €72 billion, if ABN AMRO would abandon its sale of LaSalle Bank to Bank of America. During the shareholders' meeting the next day, approximately 68 percent of the shareholders voted in favor of the breakup as requested by TCI.

The sale of LaSalle was seen as obstructive by many: as a way of blocking the RBS bid, which hinged on further access to the US markets, in order to expand on the success of the group's existing American brands, Citizens Bank and Charter One. On 3 May 2007, the Dutch Investors' Association (Vereniging van Effectenbezitters), with the support of shareholders representing up to 20 percent of ABN's shares, took its case to the Dutch commercial court in Amsterdam, seeking an injunction against the LaSalle sale. The court ruled that the sale of LaSalle could not be viewed apart from the current merger talks of Barclays with ABN AMRO and that the ABN AMRO shareholders should be able to approve other possible merger/acquisition candidates in a general shareholder meeting. However, in July 2007, the Dutch Supreme Court ruled that Bank of America's acquisition of LaSalle Bank could proceed and Bank of America absorbed LaSalle effective 1 October 2007.

On 23 July 2007, Barclays raised its offer for ABN AMRO to €67.5bn, after securing investments from the governments of China and Singapore, but it was still short of the RBS consortium's offer. Barclay's revised bid was worth €35.73 a share — 4.3% more than its previous offer. The offer, which included 37% cash, remained below the €38.40-a-share offer made the week before by the RFS consortium. The revised offer did not include an offer for La Salle Bank since ABN AMRO could proceed with the sale of that subsidiary to Bank of America. RBS would now settle for ABN's investment-banking division and its Asian Network.

On 30 July 2007, ABN AMRO withdrew its support for Barclays' offer which was lower than the offer from the group led by RBS. While the Barclays offer matched ABN AMRO's "strategic vision," the board couldn't recommend it from "a financial point of view." The US$98.3bn bid from RBS, Fortis, and Banco Santander was 9.8% higher than Barclays' offer.

Barclays Bank withdrew its bid for ABN AMRO on 5 October, clearing the way for the RBS-led consortium's bid to go through, along with its planned dismemberment of ABN AMRO. RFS formally acquired ABN AMRO on 17 October 2007. Fortis would receive ABN AMRO's Dutch and Belgian operations, Banco Santander would get Banco Real in Brazil, and Banca Antonveneta in Italy and RBS would get ABN AMRO's wholesale division and all other operations, including those in Asia.

=== 2008 financial crisis ===
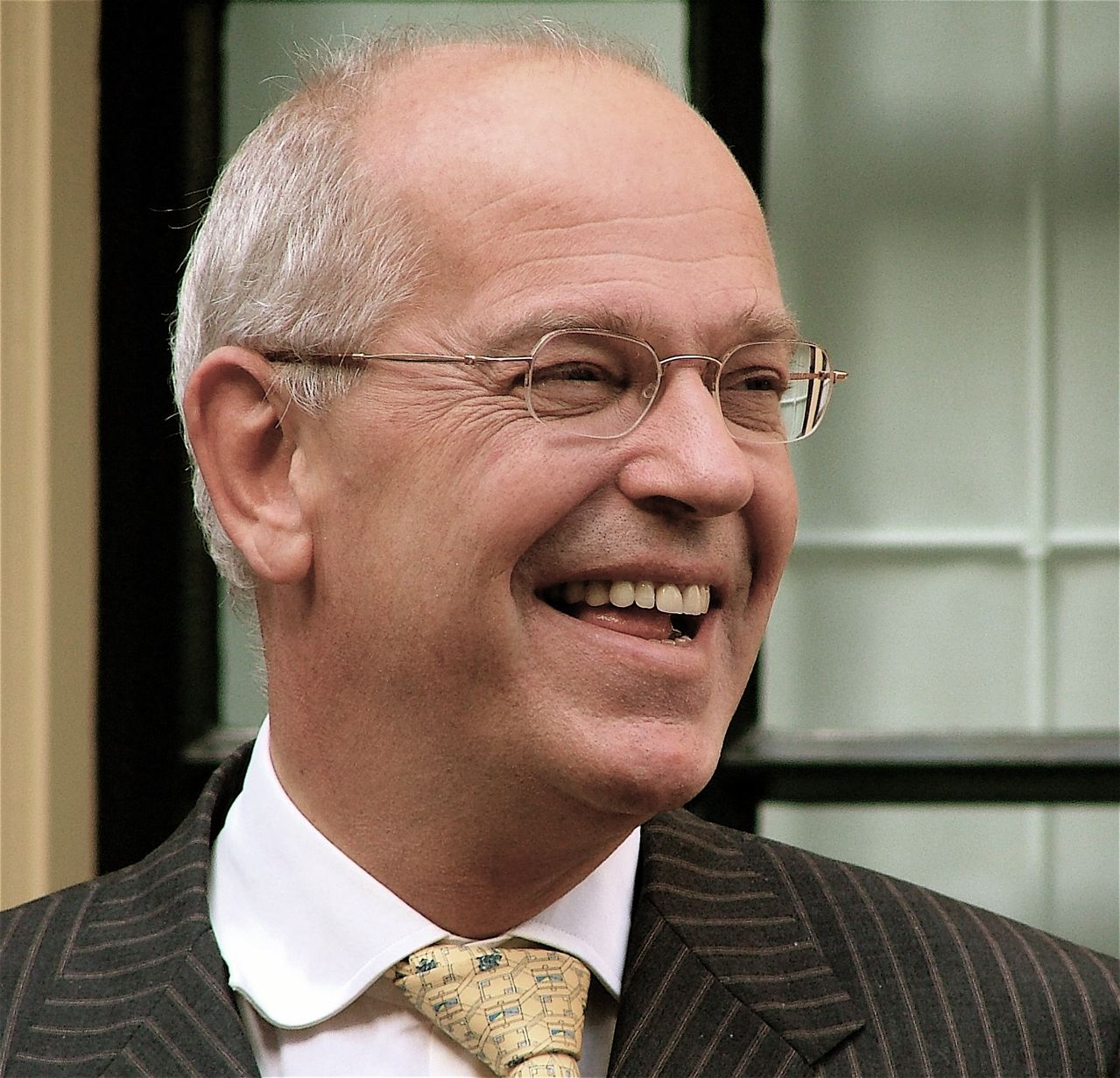
Politician Gerrit Zalm led the restructuring of ABN AMRO from 2009 to 2017

Both RBS and Fortis were increasingly visibly overextended following the ABN AMRO acquisition. On 22 April 2008, RBS announced the largest rights issue in British corporate history, which aimed to raise £12billion in new capital to offset a writedown of £5.9billion resulting from the bad investments and to shore up its reserves following the purchase of ABN AMRO. On 11 July 2008, Fortis CEO Jean Votron stepped down after the ABN AMRO deal had depleted Fortis's capital. The total worth of Fortis, as reflected by its stock value, was at that time one-third of what it had been before the acquisition, and just under the value it had paid for the Benelux activities of ABN AMRO.

On 3 October 2008, Fortis was nationalised. The Dutch government bought a number of Fortis divisions plus Fortis's share in ABN AMRO for EUR 16.8 billion. It subsequently announced that the parts of ABN AMRO it had acquired would be integrated with Fortis Bank Nederland (FBN) to create a new ABN AMRO. On 13 October 2008, British Prime Minister Gordon Brown announced a UK government bailout of the financial system. The Treasury would infuse £37 billion ($64 billion, €47 billion) of new capital into Royal Bank of Scotland Group Plc, Lloyds TSB and HBOS Plc, to avert financial sector collapse. This resulted in a total government ownership in RBS of 58%. As a consequence of this rescue, the chief executive of the group Fred Goodwin offered his resignation, which was duly accepted. Later in October, Fortis announced that it would sell its stake in RFS Holdings, which included all activities that had not been transferred yet to Fortis (i.e. everything except asset management).

=== Disposals outside of the Netherlands ===
In 2008, RFS Holdings completed the sale of a portfolio of private equity interests in 32 European companies managed by AAC Capital Partners to a consortium comprising Goldman Sachs, AlpInvest Partners and the Canada Pension Plan for $1.5 billion through a private equity secondary market transaction.

In September 2009, RBS rebranded the Morgans sharedealing business in Australia as RBS Morgans. This followed the rebranding of the ABN AMRO Australia unit to RBS Australia in March that year.

On 10 February 2010, RBS announced that branches it owned in India and the United Arab Emirates were to be rebranded under its name. HSBC Holdings said it would buy the Indian retail and commercial banking businesses of Royal Bank of Scotland for $1.8bn, however the deal fell-through in December 2012.

The operations owned by Santander, notably those in Italy and Brazil, were merged with Santander, sold or eliminated.

=== Dutch operations restructuring ===
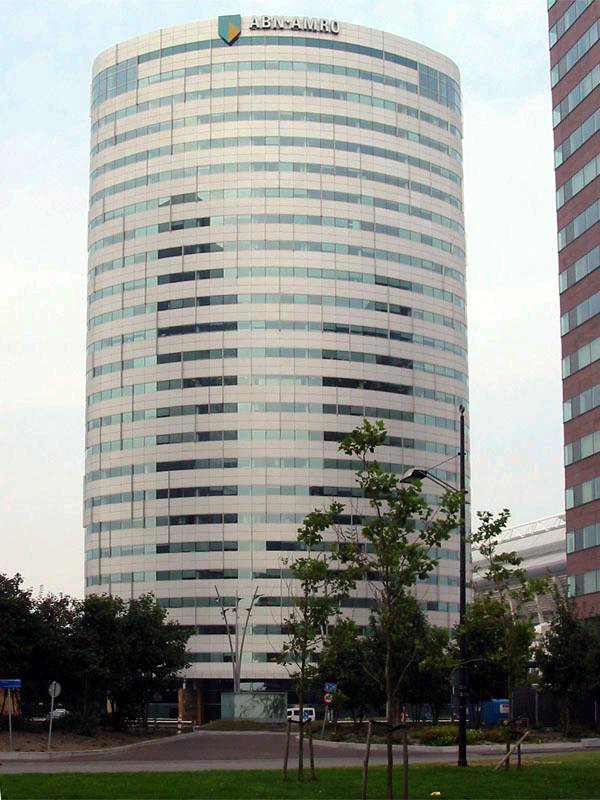
Oval Tower next to Johan Cruyff Arena, Amsterdam, with ABN AMRO logo, 2013

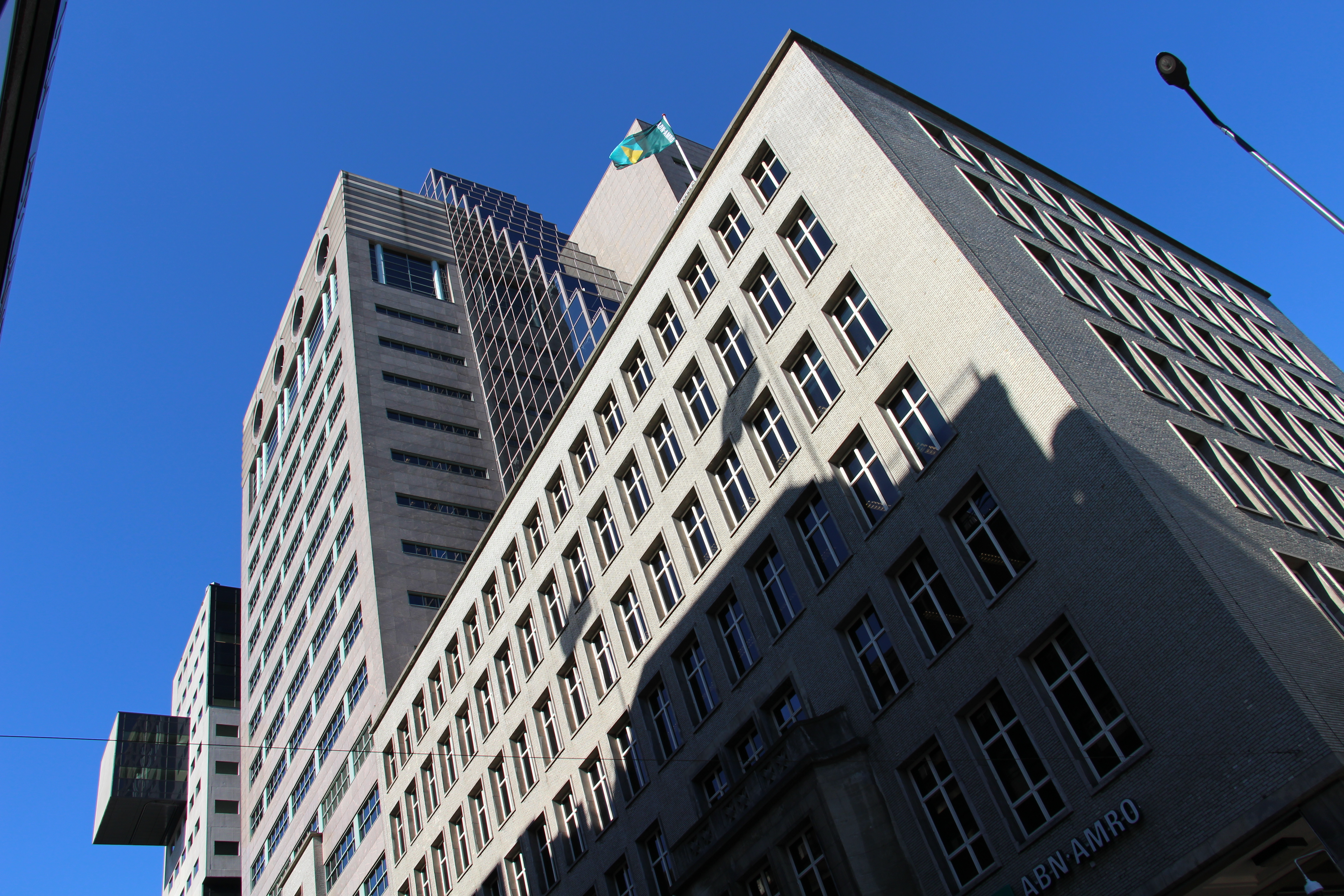
ABN AMRO building in Rotterdam

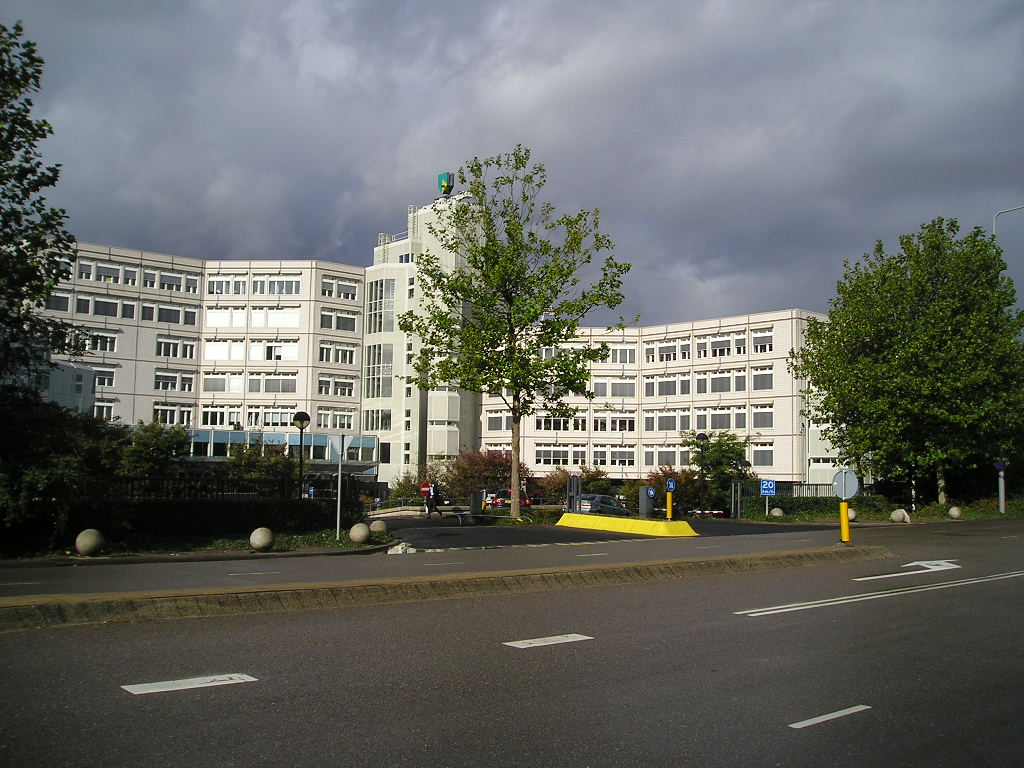
The bank plans to move most of its central functions back in 2025 to the former AMRO head office in Amsterdam-Zuidoost, known as "De Fop"

The Dutch government had obtained full control of all Fortis operations in the Netherlands, including those parts of ABN-AMRO then belonging to Fortis, at a price of €16.8bn. The government and the De Nederlandsche Bank president have announced the merger of Dutch Fortis and ABN AMRO parts will proceed while the bank is in state ownership. This was completed in July 2010, when Fortis operations in the Netherlands were rebranded ABN AMRO.

In November 2008, a Belgian court dismissed a suit by shareholders of Fortis objecting to the Belgian government's handling of the Fortis/ABN AMRO transaction and subsequent break-up.

The Dutch government appointed former Dutch finance minister Gerrit Zalm as CEO to restructure and stabilise the bank, and in February 2010 the assets it owned were legally demerged from those owned by RBS. This demerger created two separate organisations, ABN AMRO Bank N.V. and The Royal Bank of Scotland N.V. The former was merged with ABN AMRO Private Banking, Fortis Bank Nederland, the private bank MeesPierson (formerly owned by the original ABN AMRO and Fortis) and the diamond bank International Diamond & Jewelry Group to create ABN AMRO Group N.V., with the Fortis name being dropped on 1 July 2010. The remaining parts of the original ABN AMRO still owned by The Royal Bank of Scotland N.V., meanwhile, were renamed, sold or closed. As part of the agreement with the European Commission on state aid in the restructuring, ABN AMRO sold Hollandsche Bank-Unie to Deutsche Bank in April 2010, together with another subsidiary, IFN Finance.

=== Post-restructuring history ===
ABN AMRO acquired the specialist on-line mortgage provider Direktbank Hypotheken as part of the nationalisation and from 1 January 2011, it stopped selling these products under this brand to the public. It absorbed the mortgage business into its own products under the ABN AMRO brand as well as Florius brand.

In November 2020, ABN AMRO announced it would cut 2800 jobs and sell its head offices as a plan to reduce costs, hoping to save €700 million by 2024.

In December 2023, ABN AMRO acquired BUX to boost its digital presence for an undisclosed amount.

In May 2024, ABN AMRO agreed to buy Hauck Aufhäuser Lampe (HAL), a German private bank specialised in wealth management, for 672 million euros ($730 million) from Chinese conglomerate Fosun International.

In October 2024, the Dutch government announced its plan to reduce its stake in ABN AMRO from 40.5% to 30% in the coming months. In May 2025, the Dutch government announced that it has lowered its stake in ABN AMRO to 30% and further decreased it to 20% in September 2025

On 12 November 2025, ABN AMRO announced the acquisition of Dutch lender NIBC Bank for 960 million euros from American private equity firm Blackstone. In August 2026, ABN AMRO finalised the acquisition of NIBC Bank, paving the way to the legal merger and subsequent incorporation.

In October 2026, the bank announced that the Dutch government plans to further reduce its stake in ABN AMRO to 10,5%.

== Operations ==
ABN AMRO Bank has offices in 15 countries with 32,000 employees, most of whom are based in the Netherlands with only 5,000 in other countries. Its operations include a private banking division which focuses on high-net-worth clients in 14 countries as well as commercial and merchant banking operations that play a major role in energy, commodities and transportation markets as well as brokerage, clearing, and custody.

In April 2022, ABN AMRO Bank announced the company had signed a multi-year subscription extension with Switzerland based Banking and financial software development organisation Temenos. The deal was made to support ABN AMRO with customer growth and overall business expansion on the Temenos Banking cloud.

== Shareholders ==
As of 1 August 2026, ABN AMRO's main shareholders were:

Shareholder	Stake (% of ordinary shares)
STAK AAB	79.3%
Dutch state	20.7%

== Marketing ==
The bank refers to itself as ABN AMRO in all capitals, based on an acronym of the two originating banks names Algemene Bank Nederland and the Amsterdam and Rotterdam Bank, in the second case the first two letters of each city make up the word AMRO. The letters in 'ABN' are pronounced separately and 'AMRO' is pronounced as a word. For this reason some media spell the name as 'ABN Amro'. In written text both versions are used, although the bank itself uses only the uppercase version. In conversations, the bank is sometimes referred to as simply ABN or AMRO bank depending on one's location around the world.

The green and yellow shield logo was designed by Landor Associates for ABN AMRO in 1991, and has been used as a brand for the bank and all its subsidiaries.

ABN AMRO was the main sponsor of Dutch football club AFC Ajax of Amsterdam from 1991 to 2008. The sponsor logo was at the time the only one in the world to be printed vertically down the right hand side of the front of the shirt. As of 2014, ABN AMRO is one of the strategic industry partners with Duisenberg School of Finance.

The bank's former art collection has been managed since the end of 2007 by a dedicated foundation, the Stichting ABN AMRO Kunstverzameling.

== Controversies ==
=== Madoff fraud ===
As a result of the alleged fraud by Bernard Madoff, Fortis Bank Netherlands (Holding) NV lost 1 billion euros on loans from the bank (through its subsidiary Prime Fund Solutions, part of Fortis Merchant Banking) to hedge fund and as collateral investments in Bernard Madoff Investment Securities. The Dutch government said on behalf of Fortis that a claim against the Securities and Exchange Commission would be considered.

=== Goldman Sachs SEC lawsuit ===
ABN AMRO was mentioned by the United States Securities and Exchange Commission (SEC) in court filings when it sued Goldman Sachs and one of Goldman's collateralized debt obligation (CDO) traders on 16 April 2010. The SEC alleges that Goldman defrauded both IKB Deutsche Industriebank and ABN AMRO by its failure to disclose that the CDOs it sold to both banks were not assembled by a third party, but instead through the guidance of a hedge fund that was counterparty in the CDS transaction. This hedge fund, Paulson & Co., stood to reap great financial benefit in the event of default.

=== Diamond financing ===
ABN AMRO bank is one of the main banks financing the diamond business. ABN AMRO had branches in Botswana, New York, Hong Kong, Mumbai and Dubai, all of which they have sold or are in process of closing. They currently only have a branch in Antwerp, where they are also shrinking their business.

== Notable alumni ==
- Vladimer Gurgenidze ― Prime Minister of Georgia (2007―2008)
- John Hewson ― Member of the Australian House of Representatives (1987―1995)
- Graeme Le Saux ― English football player
- Anne Boden ― Founder of Starling Bank

== See also ==
- ATMIA
- List of banks in the euro area
- List of banks in the Netherlands
