= Howard J. Stoddard =

American banker (1901–1971)

Howard J Stoddard (1901–1971) was a banker in Michigan. He founded Michigan National Bank by merging several banks in mid-sized Michigan cities.

== Biography ==
Stoddard was born in Baker City, Oregon. His father was George E. Stoddard, a business partner of David Eccles. Eccles' wife was Ellen E. Stoddard, a sister of George Stoddard. Thus Howard Stoddard was the cousin of Marriner S. Eccles.

He was a member of the Church of Jesus Christ of Latter-day Saints. In 1924, Stoddard married Jennie Creer in the Salt Lake Temple of The Church of Jesus Christ of Latter-day Saints.

Stoddard donated the money to build the Latter-day Saint Student Living Center, which contains a chapel and apartments, adjacent to Michigan State University.

Stoddard received the Lansing Chamber of Commerce Community Service Award in 1960.

After Stoddard's death, his son Stanford C. Stoddard took over Michigan National Bank.
