= Samir Assaf =

Lebanese businessman

- سمير عساف
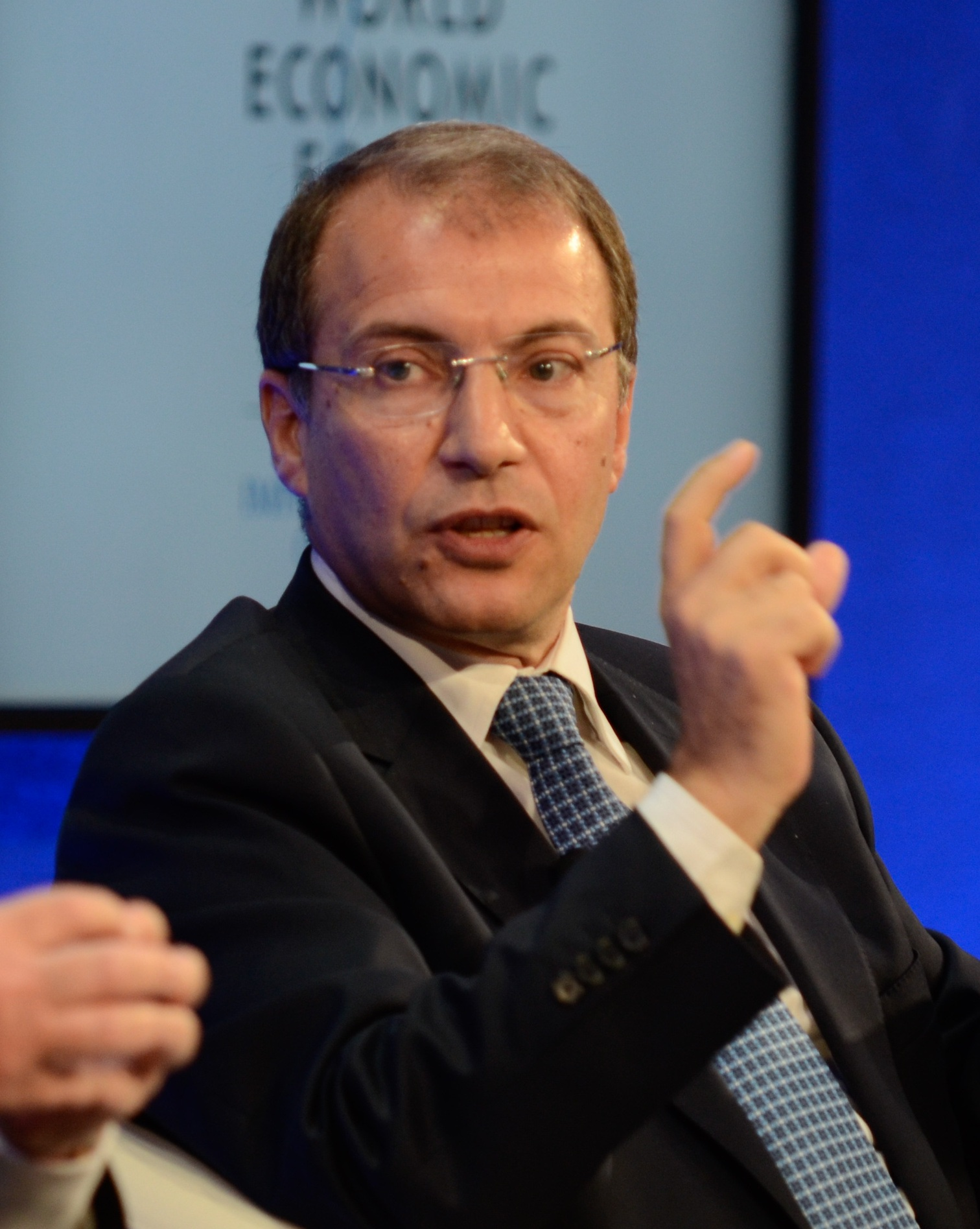
- Assaf at the World Economic Forum on the Middle East, North Africa and Eurasia in 2012
- Born: June 20, 1960 (age 66); Achrafieh, Beirut, Lebanon
- Education: Pantheon-Sorbonne University; Paris Institute of Political Science; Saint Joseph University; College La Sagesse St Joseph – Ashrafieh
- Occupations: - Chairman of the Boards of HSBC Holding Middle East; - Senior Advisor to the chairman and CEO of HSBC; - Chairman of General Atlantic Middle East; - Senior Advisor to General Atlantic; - Board member of Saudi Awwal Bank SABB; - Board member of PropertyFinder Group; - Board member of Callsign; - Member of the board of Trustees of Saint Joseph University; - Chairman of the foundation of Saint Joseph University

Samir Assaf (Arabic: سمير عساف; born 20 June 1960) is a businessman and international banker. He is a senior advisor to HSBC's Group Chairman, Group CEO and the bank's business, and non-executive chairman of the boards of HSBC Bank Middle East Limited and HSBC Middle East Holdings. He is also a senior advisor at General Atlantic and Chairman for the Middle East.

== Biography ==
Assaf was born into a Maronite Lebanese family. He completed his secondary studies at College La Sagesse St Joseph – Ashrafieh and graduated with a master's degree in economics from Saint Joseph University before moving to France during the Lebanese Civil War.

Assaf completed his undergraduate studies at the Paris Institute of Political Studies and his graduate studies at the Pantheon-Sorbonne University.

Assaf is fluent in four languages: Arabic, English, French and Spanish.

== Career ==
After leaving academia in 1987, he joined French oil giant Total in 1987, rising to head of treasury by the time he left in 1994.

In 1994, Assaf joined the French commercial bank Crédit Commercial de France to run the global market division.

In 2000, Assaf joined HSBC, following the UK bank's acquisition of French commercial bank Crédit Commercial de France. At HSBC, he started as head of fixed income trading, Europe, and head of Global Markets HSBC France. In 2006 he was promoted to head of Global Markets for EMEA and in 2007 became deputy head of Global Markets. Assaf became head of Global Markets in January 2008 and a group general manager in May 2008.

In December 2010, Assaf was appointed chief executive officer of Global Banking and Markets. Assaf also became a group managing director and joined the group management board with responsibility for Global Banking and Markets.

In December 2019, HSBC announced that two co-heads, Gregory Guyett and Georges Elhedery would succeed Assaf as head of the global banking and markets division.

In March 2020 Assaf stepped down from his executive role in HSBC to become a senior advisor to the chairman and the chief executive officer of HSBC and chairman of the board of HSBC in the Middle East.

In June 2020, Assaf has been appointed co-chairman of the Coalition for Climate Resilient Investment (CCRI), which was launched at the UN Climate Action Summit in 2019.

In October 2021, Assaf added to his responsibilities at HSBC, where he also serves as Chairman for the Middle East, by taking on a senior advisory role and the position of Chairman for the Middle East with General Atlantic, one of the most successful private growth funds.

== Awards ==
Chevalier de la Légion d'Honneur (31 December 2020)

Chevalier de la L'Ordre national du Merite (30 January 2008)
