= Michigan National Bank =

Former bank in Michigan, United States

- Industry: Financial Services
- Founded: 1940
- Defunct: 2001
- Fate: Merged with Standard Federal Bank
- Successor: Bank of America N.A.
- Headquarters: Bloomfield Hills, Michigan, United States
- Key people: Howard J Stoddard, founder Stanford Stoddard, 1970s CEO; Robert Mylod, final CEO
- Parent: Michigan National Corp. National Australia Bank; ABN AMRO

Michigan National Bank was a bank founded in Lansing, Michigan, which was established on 31 December 1940 when Howard J Stoddard consolidated six Michigan banks: First National Bank and Trust Company of Grand Rapids, First National Trust and Savings Bank of Port Huron, Lansing National Bank, City National Bank of Battle Creek, National Bank of Saginaw and First National Bank of Marshall. It purchased and absorbed the National Bank of Flint in 1942. In 1947, Central National Bank of Battle Creek was purchased and absorbed.

After Howard Stoddard died suddenly in 1971, his son Stanford "Bud" Stoddard took over. When Michigan banking laws were loosened allowing for bank holding companies, Stanford Stoddard founded Michigan National Corporation (MNC) in 1972, based in Bloomfield Hills, Michigan. This allowed co-owned but separately operated Michigan Bank N.A., located in Detroit, to be renamed Michigan National Bank of Detroit with MNC as its parent. By 1981, Michigan National had 27 affiliate banks.

In the early 1980s, Michigan National was caught up in the collapse of Penn Square Bank and Continental Illinois National Bank and Trust Company which forced the resignation of Stanford Stoddard in 1984. Robert J. Mylod became chairman and CEO of Michigan National in 1985, succeeding Edwin B. Jones. Mylod closed 140 of its 340 branches and shed half of its 700 ATMs. Loosened banking regulations in the late 1980s made MNC struggle to remain independent, but the loosened regulations allowed Michigan National to consolidate its banks into one bearing the Michigan National Bank name as the deregulation allowed for statewide branch banking in Michigan. In 1995, MNC was sold to National Australia Bank.

ABN AMRO announced on 22 November 2000, that it had signed a definitive agreement with National Australia Bank Ltd for the acquisition of MNC for US$2.75 billion in cash. At the time, it had total assets amounting to US$11.6 billion. MNC's primary subsidiary was Michigan National Bank with 3,600 employees, 184 branches and 332 ATMs. On 2 April 2001, MNC was acquired by ABN AMRO North America, Inc., the parent company of Troy, Michigan based Standard Federal Bank.

The merged company retained the Standard Federal name, but dropped Standard's federal savings bank charter in favor of Michigan National's national bank charter. The merger took effect from 9 October 2001. 59 overlapping branch offices were closed.

As a result of this merger, Standard Federal operated approximately 300 branches and 850 ATMs in the state of Michigan, more than any other financial institution in the state. It was the second-largest bank in Michigan as measured by assets.

ON 12 September 2005, ABN AMRO consolidated its U.S. commercial banking operations under the LaSalle Bank name. In 2007, ABN AMRO sold LaSalle to Bank of America, and the LaSalle branches became Bank of America branches on 5 May 2008. The former Michigan National branches in Flint, Port Huron and Saginaw were sold by Bank of America to Huntington National Bank in 2014.

== External sources ==
- Richard D Poll Howard Stoddard Founder, Michigan National Bank, Michigan State University Press 1980
