= National Bank of Flint =

Financial organization

- Industry: Banking
- Founded: 1934; 92 years ago
- Defunct: May 1, 1942; 84 years ago
- Fate: Acquired by Michigan National Bank
- Headquarters: Flint, Michigan

National Bank of Flint was a bank headquartered in Flint, Michigan. In 1942, it was acquired by Michigan National Bank.

== History ==
The bank was founded on January 30, 1934 to free up the impounded deposits of Union Industrial Bank and First National Bank of Flint, which were both closed under the Emergency Banking Act of 1933 after they suffered from bank failure.

The bank's offices were in the former Union Industrial Bank Building which is now the Mott Foundation Building, named after Charles Stewart Mott.

On May 1, 1942, the bank was acquired by Michigan National Bank. The local bank operation evolved into branches of the Huntington National Bank.
