= HSBC Bank Middle East =

Middle Eastern subsidiary of multinational bank

HSBC Bank Middle East Limited
- Type: Subsidiary
- Industry: Finance and Insurance
- Founded: 1889; 137 years ago
- Founder: Imperial Bank of Persia, Paul Reuter
- Headquarters: Dubai, United Arab Emirates
- Number of locations: 45 (2025)
- Area served: Algeria, Kuwait, Qatar and the United Arab Emirates
- Key people: Abdulfattah Sharaf (Chairman); Selim Kervanci (CEO)
- Products: Financial services
- Revenue: US$856 million (2025)
- Operating income: US$2,4 billion (2025)
- Total assets: US$64,3 billion (2025)
- Total equity: US$5,7 billion (2025)
- Website: www.hsbc.com.qa (Qatar); www.hsbc.com.kw (Kuwait); www.hsbc.ae (UAE)

HSBC Bank Middle East (HBME, Arabic: إتش إس بي سي الشرق الأوسط), is a major Emirati bank, fully owned by HSBC. Known from 1959 to 1999 as British Bank of the Middle East (BBME), It was founded in Tehran, Qajar Iran in 1889 and has successively been headquartered in Tehran (1889–1959), London (1959–1999), Jersey (1999–2016), and Dubai since 2016.

HBME is regulated by the Dubai Financial Services Authority, but remains locally regulated in each of the countries in which it operates by the country's Central Bank and its other regulators.

== History ==
In 1959, HSBC purchased the London-headquartered British Bank of the Middle East, the former Imperial Bank of Persia that had been renamed in 1952 following expropriation from its historic operations in Iran. By then, the BBME had offices in Bahrain, Kuwait, Jordan, Lebanon, Libya, Morocco, Oman, Qatar, Saudi Arabia, Syria, the Trucial States (later UAE), Tunisia, and Yemen.

During the 1960s and 1970s the bank left Syria, Iraq, South Yemen and Libya after nationalisation of the respective banking sectors. BBME also opened a branch in Djibouti in 1975 that it closed in 1986, having failed to adapt itself to the market. HSBC operated in the Palestinian Territories until 31 December 2015. All operations of HSBC, including personal and commercial banking and headquarters in Ramallah, were closed by 31 December 2015.

In 1978, the BBME's operations in Saudi Arabia was transferred to a new venture, the Saudi British Bank, in which HSBC held a minority stake of 40 percent.

In 1999, the BBME's head office was relocated from London to Jersey. On that occasion, it was renamed as HSBC Bank Middle East.

In 2013, HSBC Jordan's banking business consisted of four branches with gross assets of approximately $1.2 billion. On 19 June 2014, Arab Jordan Investment Bank (AJIB) acquired HSBC Jordan. Almost all employees were expected to transfer to AJIB.

In June 2016, the bank again transferred its place of incorporation and head office from Jersey to Dubai International Financial Centre, Dubai, UAE.

On 16 November 2016, HSBC announced the sale of its Corporate, Retail Banking and Wealth Management business in Lebanon to BLOM Bank. The sale was completed on 13 June 2017. All employees were transferred to BLOM Bank S.A.L. as part of the agreement.

== International Operations ==
- Algeria: HSBC has had a presence in Algeria since August 2008 when HSBC France opened a registered office and branch in Algiers.

In 2009, HSBC France transferred the supervision of the bank to HBME. The bank has two branches located at the cities of Algiers (head office) and Oran. It offers banking products and services for Corporate, as well as Retail Banking customers.

- Kuwait: The Imperial Bank of Iran opened a branch in 1942. It left the country in 1971 following the nationalisation of all foreign bank operations.

The bank formally reestablished a presence in Kuwait in October 2005 after receiving a license by Kuwait's Council Of Ministers.

The bank has a branch located in AlHamra Tower, in Kuwait City, offering Corporate banking, Investment banking, Private banking and Treasury services.

- Qatar: The BBME initiated its presence in Qatar in 1954. The bank offers a full range of cross-border banking products and services including Retail Banking, Commercial and Global Banking, Wealth Management and Offshore banking. HSBC is the largest foreign bank in Qatar and has three branches in Doha, located at Airport Road, City Center and Salwa, as well as a network of ATMs at 11 locations.
- United Arab Emirates: The United Arab Emirates represents a key part of HSBC's business, with 24 branches and offices. It is also the location of HSBC's regional head office.

== Former international operations ==
- Bahrain: The Imperial Bank Of Iran first opened a branch in Bahrain in 1944.

In early 2025, HSBC sold it retail banking section to Bank of Bahrain and Kuwait.

- Jordan: British Bank of the Middle East (BBME) began operations in 1949, HSBC acquired BBME in 1959. In January 2014, HSBC officially sold its operations to Arab Jordan Investment Bank.

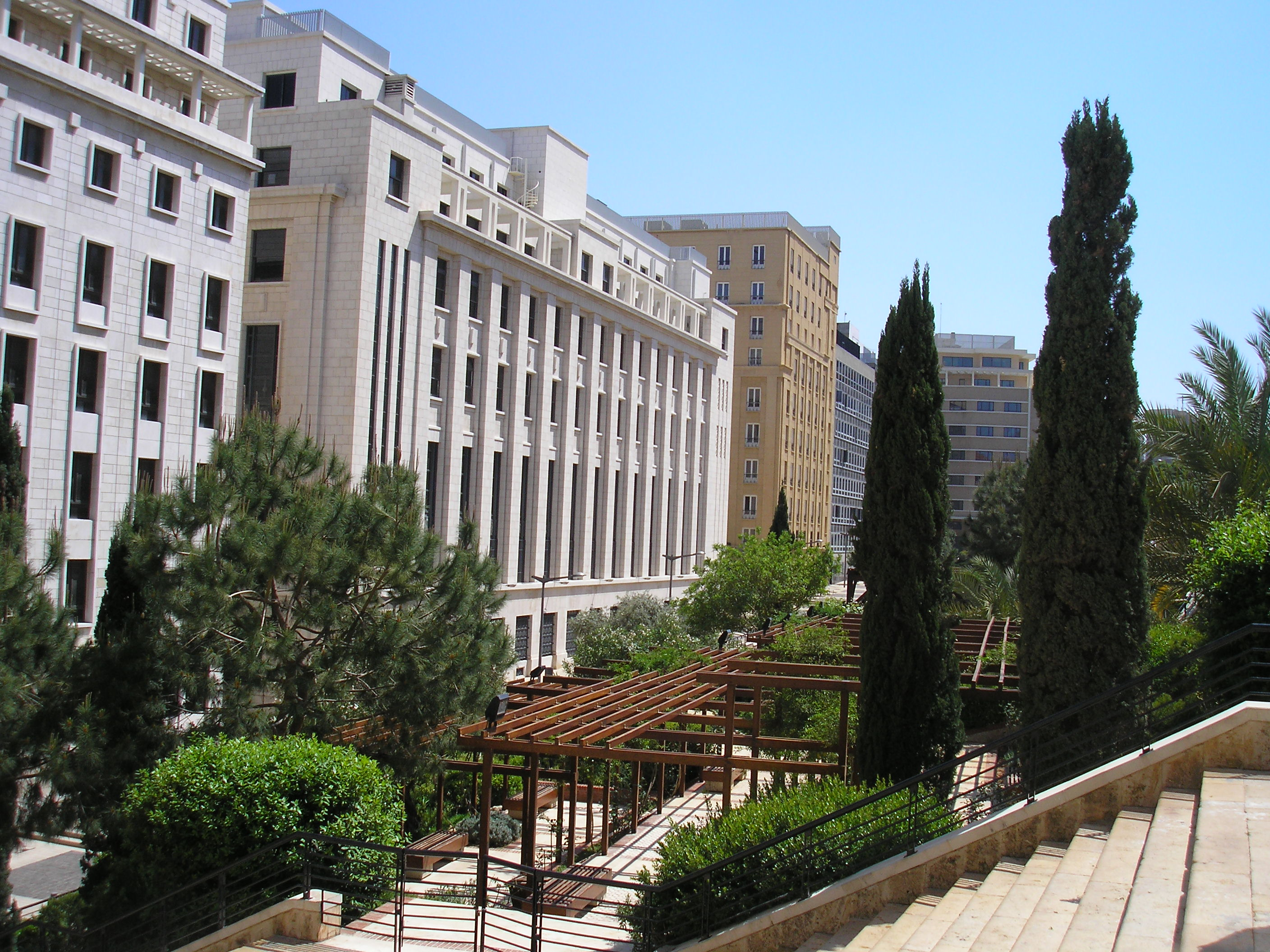
Former BBME building in Beirut

- Lebanon: British Bank of the Middle East (BBME) began operations in 1946, HSBC acquired BBME in 1959. The bank officially finalized its complete corporate sale in 2017 to BLOM Bank.
- Oman: The Imperial Bank of Iran started operating in the Sultanate in 1948, and for two decades was the only bank operating in the country. The bank assisted in the issuance of the first Omani currency in 1970. It provides a wide range of banking services for both corporate and retail banking customers. In recent years HSBC Oman has expanded to over 90 branches and in addition has a full-service trading operation, private banking operation, and a custodial service for the Muscat Securities Market. In 2012, HSBC merged with Oman International Bank and by the end of 2012 all OIB branches had been rebranded as HSBC Bank Oman S.A.O.G.

On August 17, 2023. HSBC sold its retail banking operations to Sohar International Bank.

- Pakistan: HSBC started its operations in Pakistan in 1982 with limited presence in three major cities. HSBC's offices in Pakistan were operated by The Hongkong and Shanghai Banking Corporation initially. In 2008, The Hongkong and Shanghai Banking Corporation merged its Pakistan banking business with HSBC Bank Middle East Limited. Over the course of next 4 year, it expanded its operations to all major cities of Pakistan and operated as a full-service bank. At its peak, it had 12 offices, 24/7 telephone call centre, and HSBC Premier. The bank also offered NRP (Non-Resident Pakistani) services. Out of its branches, four were located in Karachi, two each in Lahore and Islamabad, and one each in Rawalpindi, Faisalabad, Sialkot and Multan. All the cities served also offered Premier Centres.

On 9 May 2014, HSBC Bank Middle East (HBME) entered into an agreement to sell its banking business in Pakistan to Meezan Bank, citing strategy of scaling back its operations in markets with limited scale. The transaction, after regulatory and other customary approvals, completed on 14 October 2014. All employees in the business were offered positions with Meezan upon completion.

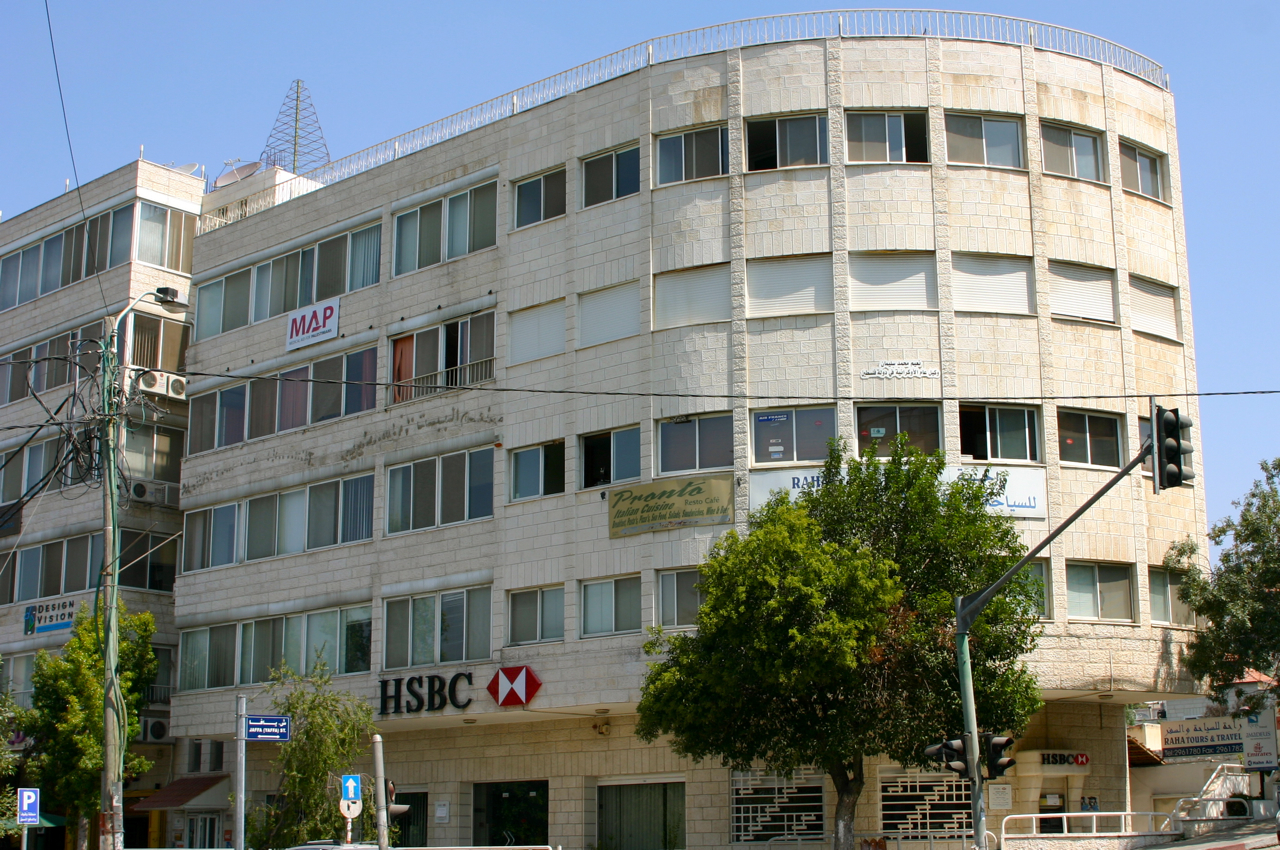
Former HSBC headquarters in Ramallah in August 2010.

- Palestine: HSBC formally entered the Palestinian market in 1998. On December 31, 2015, HSBC completely wound down its operations and closed its Ramallah headquarters, permanently exiting the Palestinian banking sector.

== Board of directors (as of 2026) ==
- Abdulfattah Sharaf (chairman)
- Samir Assaf
- Majed Najm
- Paul Lawrence
- Stephen Moss
- Amina Al Rustamani
- John Bartlett
- John Raine
- Muna Easa Al Gurg
- Neslihan Erkazanci

On 22 February 2021, the HSBC Group announced a change to its senior management team in the North Africa and Turkey region.

== See also ==
- Saudi Awwal Bank
- Bank Tejarat
