= Hollandsche Bank-Unie =

- Industry: Financial services
- Predecessor: Hollandsche Bank voor de Middelandsche Zee
- Founded: 1914
- Defunct: 2010
- Fate: Absorbed by Deutsche Bank in 2010
- Headquarters: Amsterdam, Netherlands; Buenos Aires; Rio de Janeiro; São Paulo; Santiago; Valparaíso; Genoa; Hamburg
- Products: Commercial banking Investment banking Private banking Retail banking
- Parent: Deutsche Bank

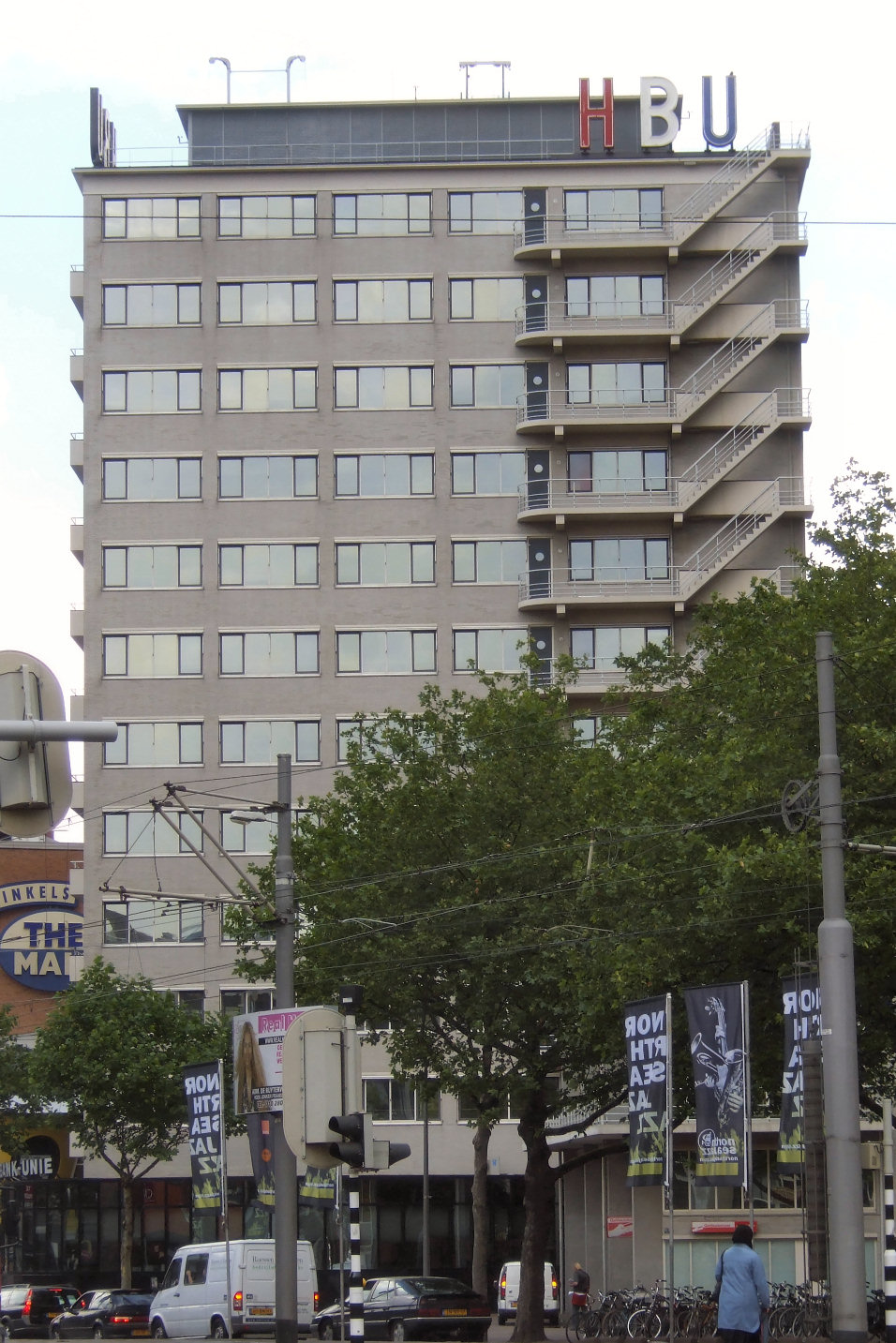
The Erasmushuis in Rotterdam were the HBU had their headquarters (in 2007).

Hollandsche Bank-Unie (HBU) was a second-tier domestic bank in the Netherlands that Deutsche Bank absorbed in 2010. It had a notable international history.

== History ==
=== Establishment ===
On 28 March 1914, the Rotterdamsche Bank, together with the Nederlandsche Handel-Maatschappij (NHM) and several smaller firms, established the Hollandsche Bank voor Zuid-Amerika (Holland Bank for South-America). The bank opened in Buenos Aires under the name Banco Holandés de la América del Sud (Banco Holandés). In 1916 the bank opened a second branch in Rio de Janeiro, and in 1919 a branch in São Paulo. By 1922, the Hollandsche Bank voor Zuid-Amerika was running branches in Genoa, Hamburg, Buenos Aires, Rio de Janeiro, Santos, Santiago, São Paulo and Valparaíso.

In 1918 the Rotterdamsche Bank and the NHM, together with smaller shareholders such as the Royal West India Mail/Royal Netherlands Steamship Company and the subsidiary of Shell that ran Curaçao's refinery, as well as Bank of Suriname decided to create a similar bank for the West-Indies. The Hollandsche Bank voor West-Indië was established with head office in Amsterdam to operate branches in Willemstad, Curaçao. In 1920 this bank was the first European bank to open a branch in Caracas.

In 1919, a year after the founding of Hollandsche Bank voor West-Indië, the Rotterdamsche Bank joined with the Hollandsche Bank voor Zuid-Amerika to establish the Hollandsche Bank voor de Middellandsche Zee (Holland bank for the Mediterranean). It opened branches in Genoa, Barcelona, Marseille, Constantinople, and later Tel Aviv.

=== Development ===
The Hollandsche Bank-Unie (HBU) was established in 1933 out of a merger between the Hollandsche Bank voor Zuid-Amerika and the Hollandsche Bank voor de Middellandsche Zee. It acquired the Hollandsche Bank voor West-Indië in 1935. The HBU made further acquisitions, S. van Dantzig & Co in 1939, and 's Gravenhaagsche Creditvereeniging en Depositkas in 1941.

Further branches were established in Uruguay (1952) and Beirut (1954), so that by 1957, the HBU maintained branches in the Netherlands, Netherlands Antilles, Argentina, Brazil, Israel, Turkey, Uruguay, Venezuela, and Suriname. The branch network was expanded further into Ecuador, and in 1965 into Paraguay. After the 6-Day War in 1967 the branches in Israel were closed.

=== ABN Era ===
The Algemene Bank Nederland acquired HBU in 1968, but it continued to operate HBU as a separate subsidiary under the HBU name. ABN decided to merge all its activities in the Netherlands Antilles under the name Antilliaanse Bank Unie. This meant a merger of the HBU's Netherlands Antilles branches, Aruba Commercial Bank (est. 1949), Bonaire Commercial Bank (est. 1962), and Edwards, Henriques & Co. (est. 1856).

In 1972 ABN absorbed all of HBU's overseas branches. HBU's international history ended in 2001 when ABN AMRO sold the Ecuadorian operation it had inherited from the HBU to Banco del Pichincha (est. 1906). The HBU name continued as a small Netherlands domestic operation within ABN.

In 2007 Fortis, which had obtained HBU in conjunction with its acquisition of ABN AMRO's operations in 2007, arranged its sale in 2009 to Deutsche Bank to comply with EU competition requirements. The Dutch government initially blocked the sale when the government took control of the Dutch parts of Fortis bank. However, after further negotiations, the sale was finally approved and completed on 1 April 2010 for 700 million Euro. Deutsche Bank absorbed HBU and its activities; this ended the HBU name.

== See also ==
- List of banks in the Netherlands
