= Abdullah Mohammed Al-Hugail =

Saudi businessman

Shaikh Abdullah Mohammed Al-Hugail (Arabic: عبد الله محمد الحقيل; born 1942, Al Majma'ah, Saudi Arabia) is a businessman. He is the former and longest-serving Chairman of the Saudi British Bank SABB (an affiliate of the HSBC Group) for nearly twenty two years. From 1997 to 2005 he was a member of the Majlis Al Shura. He received his Degree in Arabic Language and Literature, from Imam Muhammad bin Saud Islamic University in Riyadh.

== Past occupations ==
- 1962 - 1963 Assistant Secretary General for Administrative Affairs, Higher Planning Council (Saudi Arabia)
- 1963 - 1964 Director General of Financial Administrative Affairs, Central Planning Committee (Saudi Arabia)
- 1964 - 1969 Director General of Staff Affairs, Department of Municipal Affairs in the Ministry of Internal Affairs (Saudi Arabia)
- 1970 - 1974 Assistant Deputy Minister, Ministry of Municipal and Rural Affairs (Saudi Arabia)
- 1974 - 1975 Deputy Minister, Ministry of Municipal and Rural Affairs (Saudi Arabia)
- 1975 - 2009 Chairman and President of the Trading & Development Partnership (Saudi Arabia)
- 1988 - 2009 Chairman of the Saudi British Bank (SABB) an affiliate of HSBC Holdings Plc
- 1988 - 1996 Member of Al Riyadh Provincial Council Chaired by Prince Salman Bin Abdulaziz, Governor of Riyadh Province
- 1997 - 2005 Member of Majlis Al Shura (Saudi Arabia)

== See also ==
- The Saudi British Bank
- Saudi Arabia
