= Edwin B. Jones =

American business executive

Edwin Jones
- Born: Edwin Boyd Jones; February 14, 1917; Kanesville, Utah
- Died: September 3, 1998 (aged 81)
- Education: University of Utah; Utah State University (M.S.); Michigan State University (Ph.D., agricultural, food, and resource economics, 1953)
- Occupation: Corporation president
- Employer: Michigan National Bank

Edwin B. Jones was an American business executive at Michigan National Bank from 1957, retiring as its chief executive in 1985.

Jones was born in Kanesville, Utah. He graduated from Weber High School. He had a bachelor's degree from the University of Utah a master's degree from Utah State University and a Ph.D. from Michigan State University.

Jones initially came to the head of Michigan National Corporation when Stanford Stoddard stepped down in 1984.

Jones held several positions in the LDS Church including bishop, stake president, Regional Representative of the 12 (called in 1977) and president of the Chicago Illinois Temple from 1988–1991.
