= LaSalle Bank =

American bank corporation

LaSalle Bank N.A.
- LaSalle Bank logo 2002-2008
- Industry: Financial Services
- Founded: November 14, 1927
- Defunct: September 1, 2008
- Fate: Acquired by Bank of America
- Successor: Bank of America N.A.
- Headquarters: Chicago, Illinois, United States
- Products: Middle-Market Commercial Lending, Middle-Market Commercial Real Estate Lending, Domestic and International Cash Management Commercial Banking, Wealth Management, Retail Banking, Trust and Treasury
- Parent: Bank of America (current); ABN AMRO (former)

LaSalle Bank Corporation was the holding company for LaSalle Bank N.A. and LaSalle Bank Midwest N.A. (formerly Standard Federal Bank). With US$116 billion in assets, it was headquartered at 135 South LaSalle Street in Chicago, Illinois. LaSalle Bank Corporation was formerly an indirect subsidiary of Netherlands-based ABN AMRO Bank N.V., one of the world's largest banks, with total assets of EUR 986 billion, more than 3,000 locations in over 60 countries and a staff of more than 105,000. Bank of America acquired LaSalle Bank Corp. effective October 1, 2007, and officially adopted the Bank of America name on May 5, 2008.

== Corporate Profile ==
=== LaSalle Bank N.A. ===
Founded in 1927 as National Builders Bank of Chicago, it changed its name to LaSalle National Bank in 1940 after a team led by John Nuveen acquired control. In the 1960s LaSalle acquired the Mutual National Bank of Chicago founded by Frank C. Rathje. Algemene Bank Nederland (ABN) acquired the bank in 1979. In a merger of co-owned banks, the LaSalle Bank N.A. name was adopted in 1999. It was the largest bank headquartered in Chicago with US$72.2 billion in assets and US$46.8 billion in deposits. LaSalle Bank maintained 146 retail locations and 450 ATMs throughout Chicago and its neighboring suburbs.

LaSalle Bank maintained regional offices in Atlanta, Boca Raton, Boston, Cincinnati, Cleveland, Columbus, Connecticut, Dallas, Denver, Des Moines, Houston, Indianapolis, Kansas City, Los Angeles, Miami, Milwaukee, Minneapolis, Nashville, New Jersey, New York City, Omaha, Philadelphia, Pittsburgh, San Francisco, St. Louis, Tampa, Troy, Tustin, and Washington, D.C. Subsidiaries included LaSalle National Leasing Corporation, LaSalle Business Credit, LLC, LaSalle Financial Services Inc, LaSalle ABN Capital Markets LLC, AMO Capital Markets, AMO Commercial Holdings LLC, ABN Commercial Real Estate Holdings LLC. Upon the acquisition Nova Global Markets and Nova Holdings became a part of the official records.

John Rau was CEO of LaSalle Bank from 1989 to 1991, staying on ABN’s North America board until it sold LaSalle to Bank of America in 2007.

=== LaSalle Bank Midwest N.A. ===
In 1996, ABN AMRO acquired Troy, Michigan-based Standard Federal Bancorporation, the largest savings bank in the Midwest. In 2000, ABN AMRO acquired Michigan National Corporation of Bloomfield Hills and merged it into Standard Federal. The merged bank took the Standard Federal name, but operated under Michigan National's charter. In 2005, it changed its name to LaSalle Bank Midwest N.A. when ABN AMRO consolidated its U.S. commercial banking operations under the LaSalle name.

As of 2007, it was one of the largest banks in the Midwest, with US$43 billion in assets and US$24.1 billion in deposits. It operated 264 branches and 1,000 ATMs in Michigan and Indiana.

=== Sale to Bank of America ===
On April 23, 2007, an agreement was made to sell LaSalle Bank Corporation to Bank of America for US$21 billion. Bank of America officially took over LaSalle on October 1, 2007. This was a defensive move by ABN AMRO to stave off its own purchase by a consortium led by Royal Bank of Scotland. RBS wanted to merge LaSalle with its Citizens Financial Group division. At one stroke, this made Bank of America the largest bank by deposits in both Chicago and Detroit; Bank of America previously had a minimal presence in Chicago and none at all in Michigan. The investment banking arm was purchased by the third largest bank in Canada by deposits and market capitalization.

Strong connections exist to the Chicago-based PrivateBank as a swath of bankers moved to establish that bank in the mold of the original LaSalle Bank and to avoid the big bank takeover. PrivateBank was later sold to the US division of Canadian Imperial Bank of Commerce (CIBC).

== Sponsorships ==
LaSalle sponsored a number of events in its Chicago home. Many of these events were re-branded with Bank of America's name.

- LaSalle Bank Open a Nationwide Tour golf tournament
- The Chicago Marathon
- The Chicago White Sox
- The International Music Foundation Dame Myra Hess Memorial Concert
- The Navy Pier Winter WonderFest
- The Shamrock Shuffle the largest 8 km race in the world
- Handel's "Do-it-yourself" Messiah
- Army Reserve Jobs
