= Saudi Awwal Bank =

Saudi joint stock company

Saudi Awwal Bank (SAB)
- Native name: البنك السعودي الأول
- Type: Public
- Traded as: Tadawul: 1060
- ISIN: SA0007879089
- Industry: Finance
- Founded: January 21, 1978; 48 years ago
- Headquarters: Riyadh, Saudi Arabia
- Number of locations: 81
- Area served: Saudi Arabia; United Kingdom
- Key people: Lubna Olayan (Chairman); Tony Cripps (Managing Director)
- Products: Financial services
- Revenue: $1.88 billion (2017)
- Net income: ▲$1.05 billion (2017)
- Total assets: $90.79 billion (2021)
- Owners: HSBC Holdings (31%); Public shares (69%)
- Number of employees: 5,000+
- Subsidiaries: HSBC Saudi Arabia; SAB Insurance Agency Limited; SAB Insurance Services Limited; SAB Securities Limited; SAB Takaful
- Rating: A1/P-1
- Website: www.sab.com

Saudi Awwal Bank (SAB; Arabic: البنك السعودي الأول) is a Riyadh-based Saudi joint stock company in which global banking group HSBC owns a minority stake. The bank traces its origins to the British Bank of the Middle East which was acquired by HSBC in 1959. In response to restrictions on foreign ownership of banks in Saudi Arabia, Saudi Arab British Bank (SABB) was created in 1978 to manage HSBC branches and assets in the country.

In May 2018, prompted by recent changes to Vision 2030 economic reforms, SABB announced its intention to acquire Alawwal Bank in the Saudi banking sector's first merger in twenty years. On June 16, 2019, the official legal merger of Saudi British Bank and Alawwal Bank was completed, making the two banks one legal entity. The bank adopted its current name following the completion of the merger.

SAB is one of the five largest Saudi banks by deposits, and has over eighty branches across Saudi Arabia and one branch in London, England.

SAB was ranked 11th on Forbes Middle East's 30 Most Valuable Banks 2025 list. It also ranked 21st on Forbes Middle East's Top 100 Listed Companies list.

== History ==
=== British Bank of Iran and the Middle East (1950) ===
The British Bank of Iran and the Middle East (which in 1952 became British Bank of the Middle East - BBME) opened branches in Jeddah and Khobar in 1950. The Jeddah branch in particular depended for its profits on the Hajj, the Muslim pilgrimage to Makkah (Mecca). HSBC acquired BBME in 1959.

=== Saudi Arab British Bank (1978) ===
In 1976 the central bank enacted its sweeping policy of banking sector Saudization to address foreign banks' domination of the sector and its impact on the Saudi economy. Consequently, it directed all foreign bank branches to incorporate in Saudi Arabia (i.e., become Saudi companies with Saudi capital) and limited their parent companies to ownership of 40% of these new entities.

As a result, HSBC was incorporated in Saudi Arabia in 1978 and opened up to local ownership, renaming itself the Saudi Arab British Bank (SABB). Ownership became 60% Saudi and 40% HSBC, and HSBC has a technical services agreement with the bank.

HSBC Holdings of Britain held a 49% stake in the joint venture with SABB holding 51% until October 2019 when HSBC Group acquired shares from SABB to become the major shareholder with a 51% stake.

=== Merger with Alawwal Bank (2019) ===
On May 16, 2018, SAB, formerly known as SABB, and Alawwal Bank (formerly Saudi Hollandi Bank) entered into a non-binding agreement on a deal for SABB to acquire Alawwal. The agreement concluded nearly one year of negotiations, and SABB was represented by U.S. investment bank Goldman Sachs in the transaction. Alawwal Bank, as per agreement, ceased to exist as a legal entity and was absorbed into SABB, creating Saudi Arabia's third largest bank with a market cap of $17.2 billion.

SABB shareholders owned 73% of the new bank, which is chaired by Saudi businesswoman Lubna Al Olayan. The final agreement on the merger deal was announced one week after the Saudi government launched the Financial Sector Development Program, an executive program aimed at overhauling the Saudi financial sector to create an effective capital market capable of supporting the goals of the Vision 2030 economic reform plans.

The merger of the two banks was completed on 16 June 2019. The integration of the two banks was planned to be completed in about 18 months.

The integration was completed in 18 months, which resulted in the retention of the brand name "Saudi British Bank".

On 14 March 2021, Alawwal & SABB fully integrated in historic bank merger. The combined bank uses HSBC's familiar hexagon logo and typeface in its branding.

== Services ==
SAB offers services in investment banking, commercial banking, private banking and Islamic banking. SAB Islamic Financial Solutions (Arabic: الحلول المالية الإسلامية), which are part of SAB services, are regulated by the Saudi Arabian Monetary Agency and a Sharia Supervisory Committee. This ensures that SAB Islamic Financial Solutions conforms to strict adherence to the principles of Sharia.

== Credit rating ==
In August 2011, Fitch Ratings gave SAB's long-term issuer default rating (IDR) at “A” with a stable outlook as well as The Viability Rating (VR) has also been affirmed at “A”.

In October 2018, in anticipation of its pending merger with Alawwal Bank, Moody’s reaffirmed local and foreign currency deposit ratings of SAB at A1/P-1 and Alawwal Bank at A3/P-2, respectively.

== See also ==
- HSBC Bank Middle East
- British Arab Commercial Bank
- Abdullah Mohammed Al-Hugail
- List of companies of Saudi Arabia
- List of banks in Saudi Arabia
