= Alawwal Bank =

Saudi company

- Native name: البنك الأول
- Formerly: Saudi Hollandi Bank
- Type: Public
- Traded as: Tadawul: 1040
- Industry: Finance
- Founded: 1926 in Jeddah (as The Netherlands Trading Society)
- Fate: Merged with SABB (Saudi bank)
- Headquarters: Riyadh, Saudi Arabia
- Key people: Lubna Olayan (Chairman); Khalid Bin Abdullah Al-Mulhem (Vice Chairman); David Dew (Managing Director)
- Products: Corporate and institutional banking, SME banking, retail banking, investment banking, brokerage, asset management, insurance services
- Total assets: $28 billion (May 2017)
- Number of employees: 2600 (2017)
- Website: www.alawwalbank.com

The Alawwal Bank (Arabic: البنك الأول), previously known as Saudi Hollandi Bank, was a Saudi Arabian bank based in Riyadh, Saudi Arabia. It was the first operating bank in the Kingdom of Saudi Arabia and was founded in 1926 as a branch of the Netherlands Trading Society.

On 14 March 2021, Alawwal was fully merged with SABB.

== History ==
=== Netherlands Trading Society (1926) ===
It began as a branch of the Netherlands Trading Society in 1926 to serve the Hajj pilgrims from the Dutch East Indies, now Indonesia, and operated out of one office in Jeddah. As it was the only bank in the Kingdom at the time, it acted as the central bank, keeping the Kingdom's gold reserves and receiving oil revenues on behalf of the Saudi Arabian government. In 1928 the Saudi Riyal, a new silver coin commissioned by King Abdulaziz, became the Kingdom's first independent currency. The Netherlands Trading Society office in Jeddah assisted the government with the launch of the local currency.

In 1954 the Netherlands Trading Society expanded its operations in the Kingdom by opening two additional branches, in Khobar and Dammam, in the Eastern Province.

=== Saudi Hollandi Bank (1977) ===
In 1969, ABN Bank, the successor of the Netherlands Trading Society, was one of the first foreign banks to implement the Saudization initiatives set forth by the Saudi Arabian Monetary Agency (SAMA) and became the model for other foreign banks in the Kingdom. In 1977, the Saudi Hollandi Bank was established as a joint-venture company with a paid-up capital of SAR 35 million.

The branch network was expanded to include Riyadh, Jubail, Makkah, Hofuf, Madinah, Qatif and other regions.

In 2009, the bank opened its new operations center Al Waha, which houses the bank's centralised operations functions as well as the SHB Academy. Also in 2009, SHB was the first bank in the Kingdom to deploy the automated Teller Cash Recycling machines (TCR), which was introduced to enhance the Open Branch concept that allows direct contact between the bank's employees and its customers.

At the end of June 2010, the bank's paid-up capital amounted to SAR 3,307 million. Saudi Hollandi Bank employs 1,417 staff with a Saudization ratio of over 87.44% and operates 43 branches, 15 Ladies Sections, 30 Preferred Banking Centres and 246 ATMs providing banking services throughout the Kingdom.

In June 2011, Saudi Hollandi Bank Launched The First MasterCard World Credit Card With A Silver Mark in the Middle East.

=== Alawwal Bank (2016) ===
In November 2016, Saudi Hollandi Bank changed its name to Alawwal Bank as part of a new corporate identity that was to be rolled out over the next three months, according to a statement. Alawwal, meaning “The First” in Arabic, refers to the bank’s status as the first bank to launch in the country in 1926.

=== Merger with Saudi British Bank (2019) ===
On 4 October 2018 Arab News reported that the Alawwal Bank and the Saudi British Bank (SABB) are about to become one with a merger proposal from both sides in order to create Saudi Arabia's third largest bank. On 16 June 2019, the merger was legally completed.

The integration was planned to complete in about 18 months, which will result in the merged name "Saudi Awwal Bank".

On 14 March 2021, Alawwal was fully integrated in to SABB.

== Operations ==
SHB is organized into three main business segments: Corporate Banking, Personal Banking and Treasury. In addition, the Bank provides brokerage, asset management and investment banking services through its subsidiary Saudi Hollandi Capital.

=== Principal divisions and subsidiaries ===
- Saudi Hollandi Capital: engages as principle and agent in retail equity brokerage, asset management, corporate finance and investment advisory activity, debt arrangement and securities custody services
- Wataniya Insurance Company: with 20% ownership for Saudi Hollandi Bank
- Saudi Hollandi Insurance Agency Company: entirely owned as its bancassurance distribution arm with licensed in insurance activities.
- Saudi Hollandi Real Estate Company: entirely owned in support of SHB’s Home Finance by being involved in the registration of real estate title deeds

=== Branches and ATMs ===
Saudi Hollandi Bank has over 265 ATMs, 6 Business Banking Centres, 30 Preferred Banking Centres and 45 branches across the kingdom, in which 16 are women-only sections. Amongst Saudi Hollandi’s ATMs are Teller Cash Recycling machines (TCR). Preferred Banking Centers are for Saudi Hollandi’s VIP clients.

== See also ==
- List of banks in Saudi Arabia
