= BinckBank =

Dutch bank

BinckBank N.V.
- Company type: Naamloze vennootschap
- Traded as: Euronext: BINCK
- Industry: Financial services
- Founded: 2000; 26 years ago
- Headquarters: Amsterdam, Netherlands
- Key people: Koen Beentjes (CEO), Kees Scholtes (Chairman of the supervisory board)
- Services: Stockbroker; Electronic trading platform
- Revenue: €184.8 million (2010)
- Operating income: €60.3 million (2010)
- Net income: €44.2 million (2010)
- Total assets: €3.217 billion (end 2010)
- Total equity: €468.9 million (end 2010)
- Number of employees: 565 (FTE, end 2010)
- Website: www.binckbank.com

BinckBank was a Dutch stockbrokerage that offered an electronic trading platform to trade financial assets.

== History ==
The company was founded in 2000 by four former employees of IMG Holland, a defunct broker. The company was only acting as a broker in the professional market between banks and derivative firms. In October 2000, Binck opened a retail branch. Major trading firm AOT financed the start-up partly, taking a 52% stake, and bought the remaining shares in 2004.

In 2007, Binck acquired Alex Beleggingsbank from Rabobank for €390 million euros.

In 2009, Binck announced a joint venture with the Dutch market maker Optiver to create a platform to internalize Binck's order-flow to Optiver.

In 2019, the company was acquired by Saxo Bank.
