= Algemene Bank Nederland =

Dutch bank created by merger in 1964

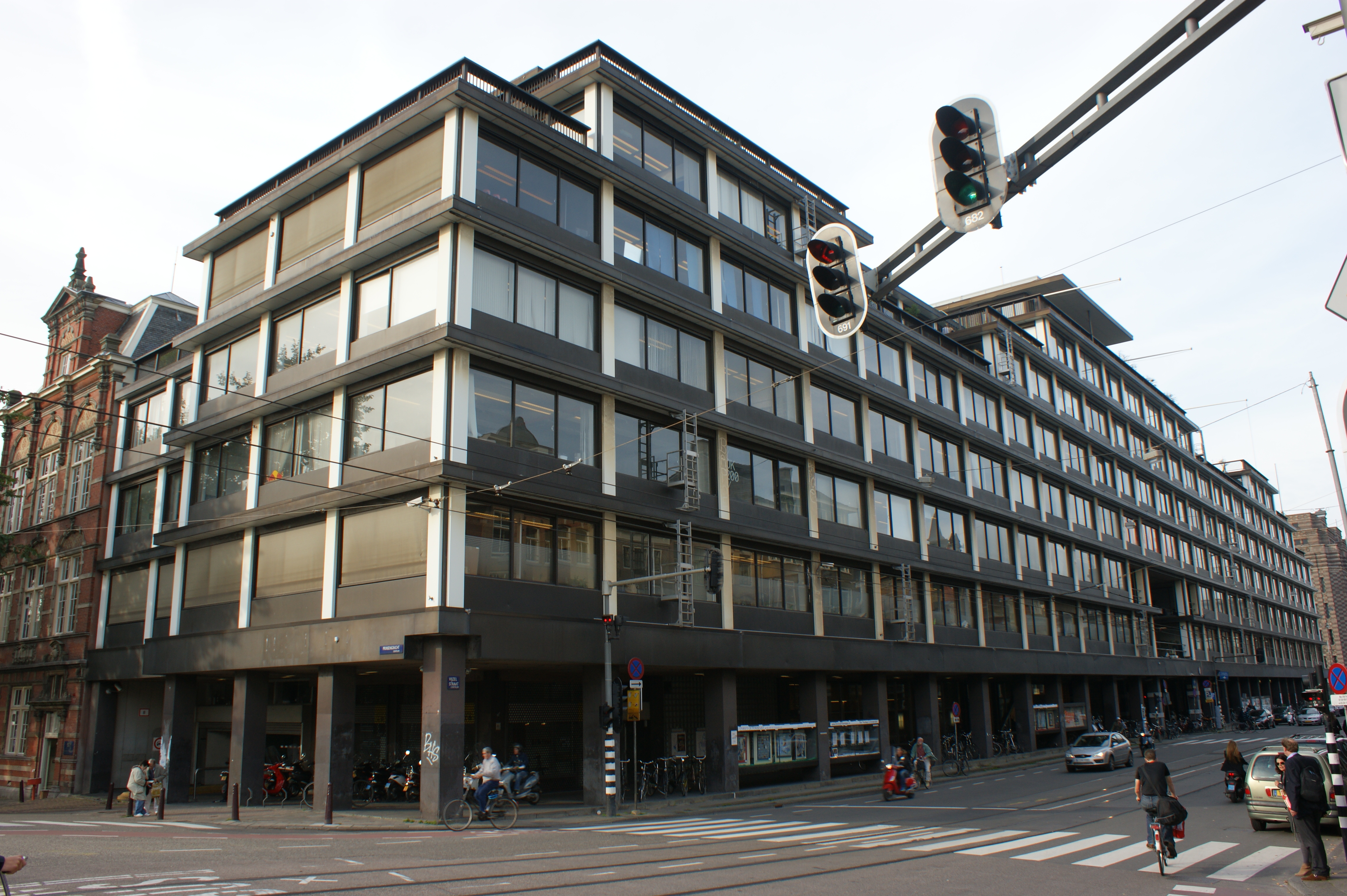
- Vijzelbank building in Amsterdam, head office of ABN built in 1969-1973
- Industry: Financial services
- Founded: 1964; 62 years ago
- Defunct: 1991
- Fate: Merged with AMRO Bank
- Successor: ABN AMRO
- Headquarters: Amsterdam, Netherlands
- Products: Commercial banking Investment banking Private banking Retail banking
- Parent: ABN AMRO

Algemene Bank Nederland (ABN, "General Bank of the Netherlands") was a Dutch bank that was created in 1964 through the merger of the Netherlands Trading Society (Dutch: Nederlandsche Handel-Maatschappij, NHM, est. 1824) with the Twentsche Bank (TB, est. 1861). In 1991, ABN merged with Amsterdamsche en Rotterdamsche Bank (AMRO Bank) to form ABN AMRO.

== History ==
=== NHM-TB merger ===
Logo used from 1964 to c. 1974, combining NHM's anchor emblem and establishment date with the TB's prancing horse.

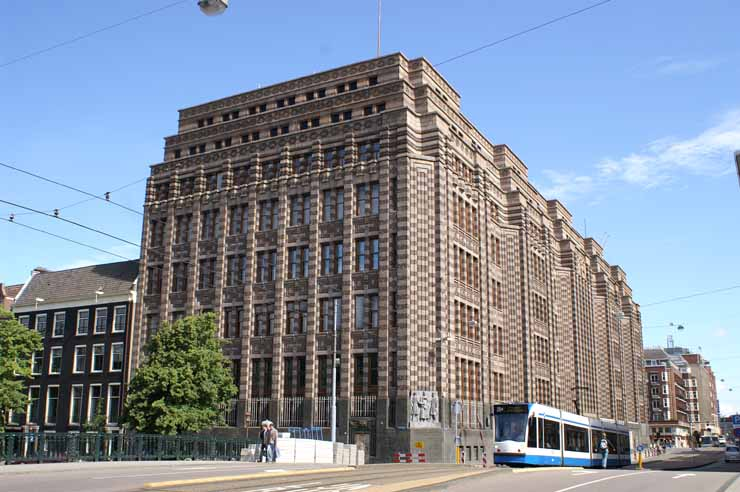
De Bazel building in Amsterdam, head office of the NHM, then of ABN until 1973

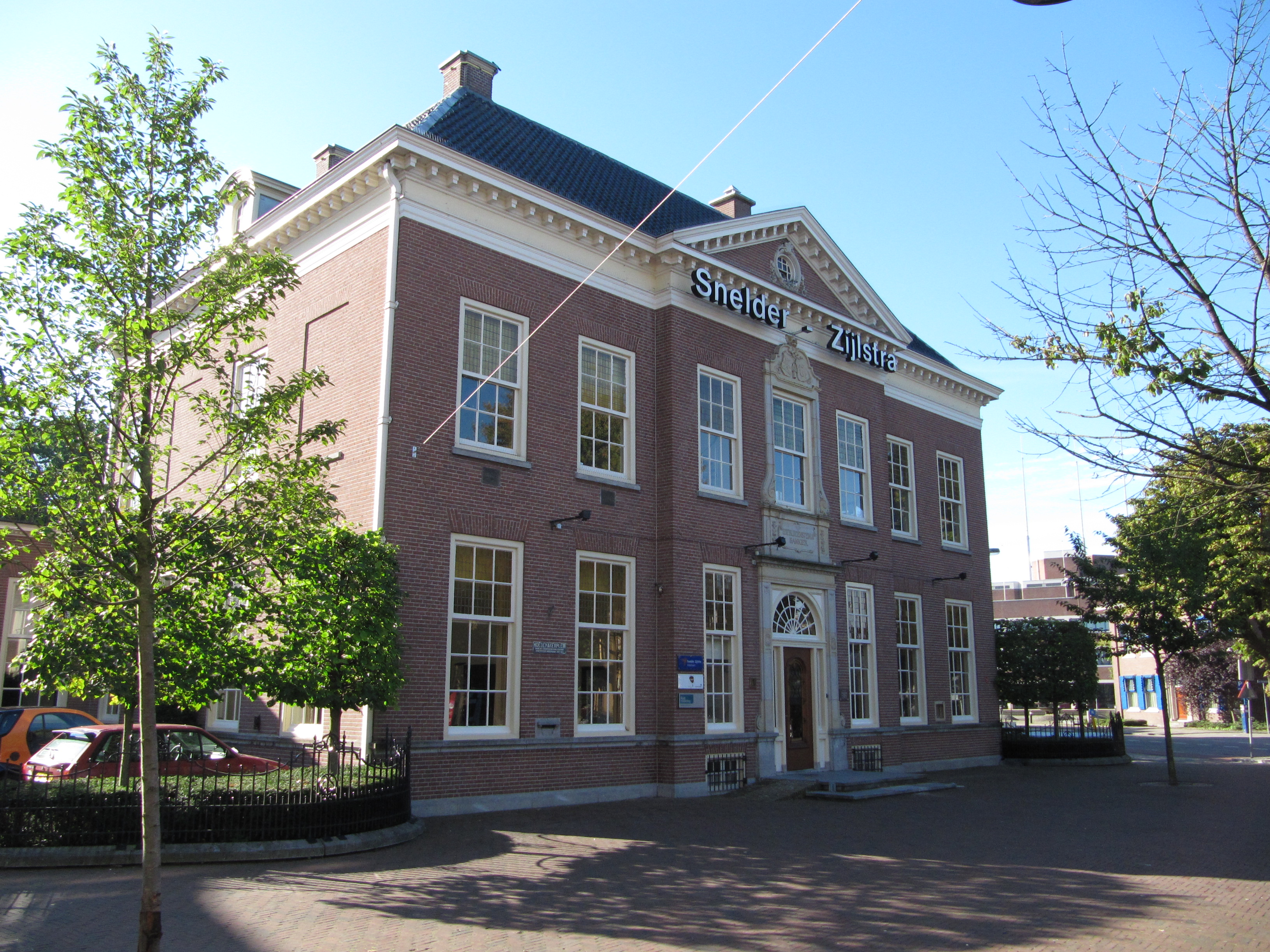
Former Twentsche Bank head office in Enschede

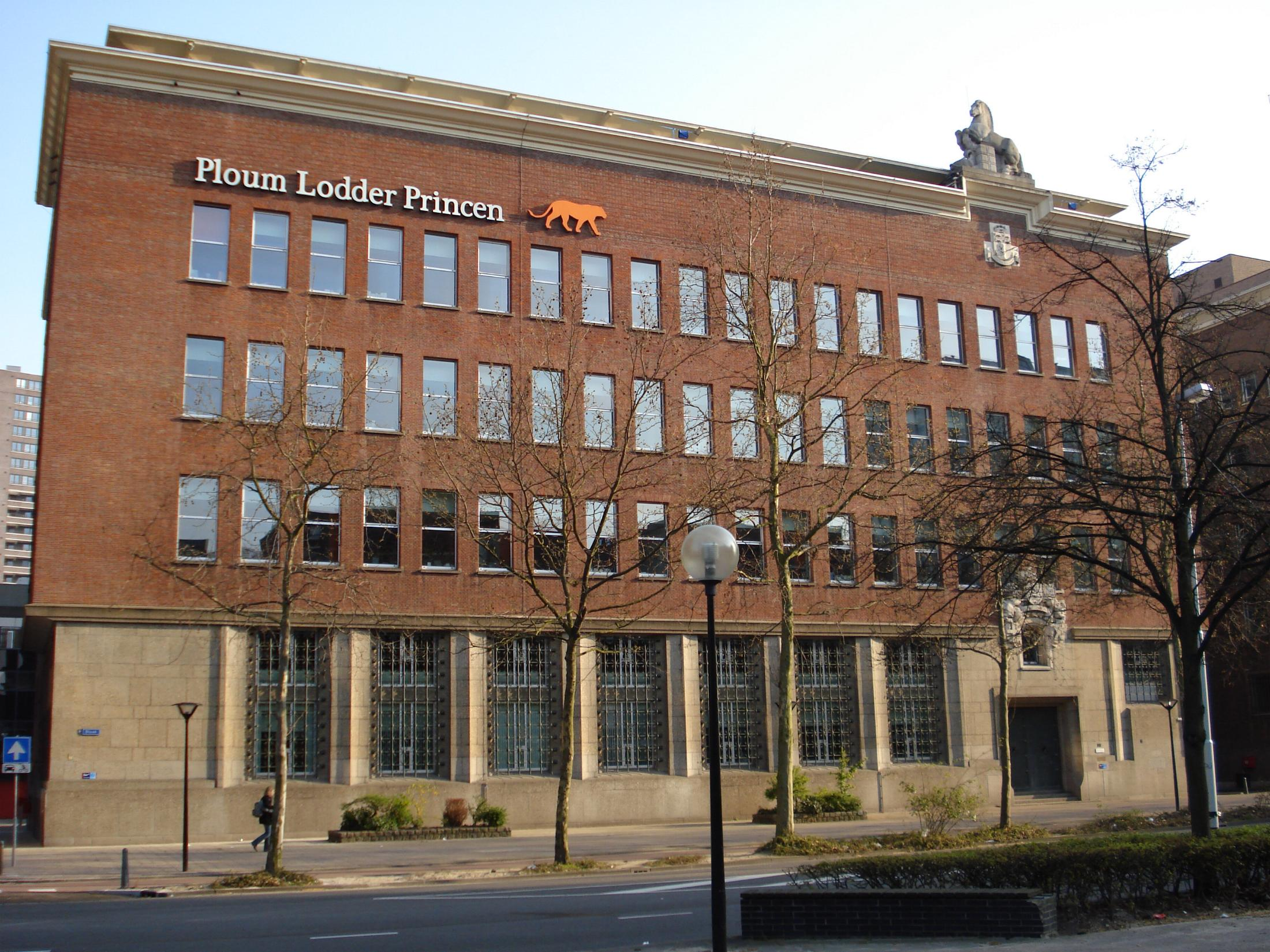
Twentsche Bank building in Rotterdam

The Netherlands Trading Society and Twentsche Bank announced their merger to form ABN Bank on 4 June 1964. An important reason for the merger was the international trend towards concentration. Banks were obliged to scale up their operations. The extensive international network of NTS and the strong Dutch home base of TB, notably in stockbroking and foreign exchange dealing, complemented each other perfectly. Another reason for joining forces was the past involvement of the two banks in developing the textile industry in the Twente region of the Netherlands. NTS had been sharing the running expenses of TB's branch in London (which opened in 1858) since 1953.

=== Expansion ===
The December 1967 acquisition of the Hollandsche Bank-Unie (HBU) with its strong position in South America gave the international network a more balanced structure. The Dutch branch network of ABN Bank was expanded substantially from 1964 onwards in step with the growing significance of retail banking. The acquisition of Bank Mees & Hope in 1975 reflected ABN Bank's diversification strategy since the chief strength of BMH was international commodity finance. After the take over BMH continued to operate independently under its own name. Kingma’s Bank of Leeuwarden, which BMH had acquired in 1971, was transferred to ABN Bank in early 1981 and continued its operations under the name of ABN/Kingma's Bank. ABN Bank was also active in hire-purchase finance. In 1967 it acquired Industrieele Disconto Maatschappij, in which it already held a minority interest through TB.

The independent stockbroking subsidiary Nachenius, Tjeenk & Co, a 1991 amalgamation of two earlier (1977) acquisitions, Weduwe Tjeenk & Co (est. 1810) and Nachenius & Dudok van Heel (est. 1797), gave ABN Bank a foothold in the private banking market.

The bank also continued its international expansion and in September 1977 the three former Nederlandsche Handel-Maatschappij branches in Saudi Arabia were incorporated in a new bank, Albank Alsaudi Alhollandi in Riyadh. This bank steadily increased its number of branches and changed its name to Saudi Hollandi Bank in 1991.

An important acquisition occurred in 1979 with the takeover of Chicago-based LaSalle National Bank. This acquisition laid the foundation for what would become the second home market of the bank. Founded in 1927 as National Builders Bank of Chicago, LaSalle Bank gave ABN its first firm foothold in the US Midwest. In 1990 Exchange Bancorp of Chicago was incorporated in LaSalle.

ABN also stepped up its activities in Europe. In April 1980 it obtained a majority interest in Neuflize Schlumberger Mallet (NSM), a storied French private bank in Paris. With roots dating back to 1667, NSM was one of the oldest and prestigious private banks in France. ABN Bank's Parisian subsidiary Banque Jordaan & Cie (in which TB had held an interest since 1909) became part of NSM. NSM acquired Banque Demachy in 1999 to become NSMD.

Although ABN Bank had a strong international network of its own, it chose to cooperate with other European banks. The Associated Banks of Europe Corporation (ABECOR) was founded in Brussels in 1972 by ABN Bank and three other banks keen to initiate innovations in banking. ABECOR established Banque de la Société Financière Européenne in Paris which works in the field of medium-term loans. ABN Bank was also involved in setting up Society for Worldwide Interbank Financial Telecommunication (SWIFT), in Brussels. Computer links between affiliated banks have greatly accelerated international transactions.

=== Merger with AMRO Bank ===
With the coming prospect of the internal European market from 1992, ABN Bank and AMRO Bank decided to approach the challenging new era with combined forces. The merger was completed rapidly after ABN AMRO Holding N.V. made a successful bid for the shares of both banks in August 1990. On September 22, 1991, the new ABN AMRO Bank was established, with head office in Amsterdam.

== See also ==
- List of banks in the Netherlands
