= Payment card interchange fee and merchant discount antitrust litigation =

Largest consumer antitrust class action settlement in U.S. history

The payment card interchange fee and merchant discount antitrust litigation is a United States class-action lawsuit filed in 2005 by merchants and trade associations against Visa, Mastercard, and numerous financial institutions that issue payment cards. The suit was filed because of price fixing and other allegedly anti-competitive trade practices in the credit card industry. In February 2019, U.S. District Court Judge Margo K. Brodie approved a settlement in the case that amounted to $5.54 billion. After four more years of litigation, in March 2023, the Court of Appeals for the Second Circuit affirmed the District Court's final approval order, with a modification reducing service awards, and allowing the claims process to move forward.

In December 2023, claim forms started being mailed to millions of business owners in the class who accepted Visa and/or Mastercard payment cards during the 15-year class period from January 1, 2004, to January 25, 2019. The claims period was extended from May 31 to August 30, 2024, and further extended to February 4, 2025.

== Claims ==
Plaintiffs alleged that Visa, Mastercard, and other major credit card issuers engaged in a conspiracy to fix interchange fees, also known as swipe fees, that are charged to merchants for the privilege of accepting payment cards, at artificially high levels. The plaintiffs also alleged that the defendants unfairly interfere with merchants from encouraging customers to use less expensive forms of payment such as lower-cost cards, cash and checks.

== Settlement ==
On November 27, 2012, United States District Judge John Gleeson entered an order granting preliminary approval to a proposed settlement. Speaking of the settlement, Gleeson said, "I don't mean to suggest for a moment that there are not a number of issues that are going to require significant scrutiny. I'm not persuaded that the deficiencies are the obvious deficiencies that ought to derail preliminary approval." Gleeson's approval was important because it allowed the potential seven million or more members of the class to begin the process of opting in or out of the settlement.

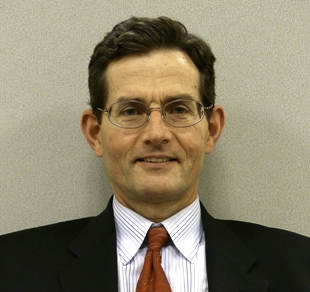
Judge John Gleeson

=== Terms ===
The settlement provided for the cash equivalent of a 10 basis-point reduction (0.1 percent) of swipe fees charged to merchants for a period of eight months. This eight-month period would probably begin in the middle of 2013. The total value of the settlement was to be about $7.25 billion. This amount could have decreased based on the number of plaintiffs who opted out.

A part of the settlement that allows merchants to charge fees to customers paying via credit card in order to recoup swipe fees took effect on January 27, 2013. Debit cards and transactions in the ten states that prohibit credit-card surcharges were not affected. Many large retailers, such as Wal-Mart and Target, opted not to impose surcharges. In the event of a return, surcharges are refunded along with the purchase price of the merchandise. The National Association of Convenience Stores (NACS) complained that this measure "merely make[s] retailers the collection agents for the banks." The National Retail Federation said, "that card company fees are the problem and the surcharge story is a volume that belongs on the fiction aisles. The real threat to retailers and their customers continues to be price-fixed hidden fees that can only be cured by transparency and competition."

Opponents objected to provisions that would bar future lawsuits and even prevent merchants from opting out of significant portions of the proposed settlement. Stephen Neuwirth, a lawyer representing Home Depot, said, "It's so obvious Visa and MasterCard were prepared to make a large payment because of the scope of the releases being given. It's all one quid pro quo and merchants like the Home Depot are being denied the chance to opt out of that quid pro quo and say this is a bad deal."

=== Opposition ===
According to court filings, Target, Wal-Mart, Home Depot, Neiman Marcus, Saks, and 1,200 other plaintiffs opposed the settlement. A group of large merchants including Kroger, Walgreens, and Safeway reached a separate agreement with the defendants over swipe fees. The NACS harshly criticised the settlement and urged its members to opt out. Tom Robinson, chairman of NACS and president of Robinson Oil, said, "This proposed settlement allows the card companies to continue to dictate the prices banks charge and the rules that constrain the market including for emerging payment methods, particularly mobile payments. Consumers and merchants ultimately will pay more as a result of this agreement — without any relief in sight." Josh Floum, general counsel for Visa, responded, "Our belief that the agreement will eventually receive final approval was strengthened today. As we have said from the beginning, this settlement is a fair and reasonable compromise for all parties."

Class members could opt out of the monetary part of the settlement in addition to objecting in court. Visa, MasterCard, and issuing banks could scuttle the settlement if merchants that account for 25 percent or more of credit card spending in the United States since January 1, 2004, to the approval of the settlement.

The NACS strongly encouraged its members to opt out. Hank Armour, president and CEO of NACS said, "if you do nothing, it will be presumed by the court that you accept the terms of the proposed settlement. Even if you submitted a declaration objecting to the proposed settlement last fall, you must respond to the notice and submit something in writing again if you want to opt-out of or object to the proposed settlement." The NACS created a website dedicated to encouraging merchants to opt out, which provided detailed instructions on how to do so.

The Retail Industry Leaders Association (RILA), whose members include many prominent retailers such as Best Buy and Wal-Mart, opted out of the proposed settlement and urged its members to do the same. Deborah White, a senior RILA official, said, "RILA and the overwhelming majority of our members agree that the proposed class action settlement is a bad deal for retailers." RILA members were legally required to opt out on their own.

Prior to this settlement, merchants won a major victory against payment processors and card issuers with the passage of the Dodd-Frank financial reform bill, which required the Federal Reserve to write rules for swipe fees on debit card purchases. Richard Durbin, the senator from Illinois who was the main proponent of those rules, said that the proposed settlement on credit card swipe fees "gives Visa and MasterCard free rein to carry on their anti-competitive swipe-fee system with no real constraints and no legal accountability. This is not a settlement I would agree to. I hope that the remaining merchant plaintiffs will review the proposed settlement carefully and think hard about whether it will be good for the future of our credit- and debit-card systems." Barney Frank, a representative from Massachusetts and a primary supporter of legislation to repeal rules on debit card swipe fees, said he supported the settlement, and stated, "A free-market approach in this area will be better for the economy and all concerned parties."

=== Appeal ===
Immediately after the preliminary approval of the settlement by Judge Gleeson in November 2012, a group of plaintiffs appealed to have it invalidated. They argued that the settlement violated their rights by not allowing them to opt out of some provisions. The inability to opt out of litigation releases that bar future suits was an important point of contention. Jeff Shinder, a lawyer for the plaintiffs, said, "The proposed settlement violates the due process rights of millions of merchants by denying them the ability to opt out of the injunction, and this fundamental issue of law should be addressed now before notice goes out to merchants."

In January 2013, the United States Court of Appeals for the Second Circuit ruled that any appeals against the settlement that received preliminary approval in November 2012 would not be heard until objections to the settlement were filed and considered by the trial court in September 2013. The practical effect of this ruling was to allow settlement notices to be sent to eligible merchants.

In June 2016, the United States Court of Appeals for the Second Circuit overturned the settlement, on the ground that class counsel could not adequately represent merchants who have a significant interest in the monetary relief provided by the settlement, nor merchants who could only benefit from the prospective injunctive relief.

=== Legal fees ===
In April 2013, the three law firms appointed to lead the plaintiffs in this case asked for $720 million in fees. If approved, this would have been one of the largest awards of legal fees in American history. They argued that such high fees were reasonable given the amount of the settlement and the risks and complexity of the case. This dollar amount represents about 4.5 times what would normally be billed at an hourly rate for the work performed. Approval of these fees partially depended upon approval of the settlement. The law firms in question are Robins, Kaplan, Miller & Ciresi; Berger Montague; and Robbins Geller Rudman & Dowd LLP. Any fees awarded would be split among about 40 different law firms. The distribution of fees is normally decided by lead counsel.

=== Independent expert ===
In December 2013, U.S. District Court Judge John Gleeson approved a settlement in the case that amounted to $7.25 billion. The settlement lowers interchange fees for merchants, and also protects credit card companies from being sued over the issue again in the future. That settlement was reversed. Another settlement for US$6.24 billion was scheduled to go before the district court on November 7, 2019.

Judge Gleeson retained Alan Sykes as an independent expert to help the judge evaluate the proposed settlement. Gleeson said that Sykes would "advise the court with respect to any economic issue that may arise in connection" with final approval of the settlement. Gleeson mentioned appointing an independent expert during the hearing on preliminary approval in November 2012. He informed the parties in March 2013 that he was considering Sykes, a professor at New York University's law school. According to a resume published by the court, Sykes previously taught at Stanford and the University of Chicago, and has published several books and scholarly articles on economics and trade. No party objected to the appointment of Sykes. While parties routinely make use of experts to support their positions, judges rarely exercise this option.

== Parties and counsel ==
In addition to Visa and MasterCard, most of the largest credit card-issuing American banks, such as JPMorgan Chase, Bank of America, CitiBank, Wells Fargo, and Capital One, were defendants in the case. Named class plaintiffs included the National Association of Convenience Stores, the National Grocers Association, the National Restaurant Association, the National Community Pharmacists Association, and 15 others.

Co-lead class counsel included Laddie Montague, Merrill Davidoff, and Michael Kane of Berger Montague; Craig Wildfang, Thomas Undlin, and Ryan Marth of Robins Kaplan Miller & Ciresi; and Patrick Coughlin, Bonny Sweeney, David Mitchell, Alexandra Bernay, and Carmen Medici of Robbins Geller Rudman & Dowd.

Counsel for Visa included Robert Vizas, Robert Mason, Mark Merley, and Matthew Eisenstein of Arnold & Porter. Counsel representing MasterCard included Keila Ravelo, Wesley Powell, and Matthew Freimuth of Willkie Farr & Gallagher; and Kenneth Gallo, Joseph Simons, Andrew Finch, and Gary Carney of Paul Weiss Rifkind Wharton & Garrison.

== Case name and venue ==
This case is formally known as In re Payment Card Interchange Fee and Merchant Discount Antitrust Litigation. The docket number was 05-md-01720. The United States District Court in the Eastern District of New York in Brooklyn was the venue.

The case is more commonly known as Swipeopoly, in reference to the alleged Visa and Mastercard duopoly over the payments network. Other variations include the "Swipeopoly" settlement and the "swipe fee scandal".

== Continuing legal developments ==
In March 2024, a settlement in the injunctive relief portion of the payment card interchange fee case was announced to reduce what are known as "swipe fees" for merchants in the U.S. This change, set to last five years, was expected to save retailers about $30 billion and mark the end of a long-standing legal battle over antitrust issues involving these major credit card issuers Visa and Mastercard. As part of the settlement, the companies agreed to lower their processing fees at all US merchants by at least four basis points for the next three years, ensuring these reduced rates stick for a total of five years.

The deal included a provision that the reduced fees must be at least seven basis points lower than the current average. An independent auditor was to review this aspect to confirm compliance.

Judge Brodie of the U.S. District Court for the Eastern District of New York declined to provide preliminary approval on June 25, 2024. Visa's CEO told analysts that the company was seeking a new settlement, which could occur before, during or even following a trial. US District Court Judge Brian Cogan took over the long-running case in September 2025, and is expected to render an opinion in 2026.

On September 24, 2024, the U.S. Department of Justice filed a civil antitrust lawsuit against Visa, alleging "monopolization and other unlawful conduct in debit network markets in violation of Sections 1 and 2 of the Sherman Act".

Separately, in October 2025, merchants agreed to a $231.7 million settlement before Judge Brodie, as B & R Supermarket, Inc., et al v. Visa, Inc. et al, for costs imposed in frauds related to counterfeit, lost, or stolen cards, with Mastercard paying $79.8 million, and Visa liable for $119.7 million. American Express and Discover had previously agreed to pay $20 million and $12.2 million, respectively, of the total settlement.

== See also ==
- List of class-action lawsuits
