= Chicago Clearing Corporation =

Our Mission: Recover Every Dollar for Every Harmed Investor

- Type: Private
- Industry: Securities Claim Filing
- Founded: Chicago, Illinois, United States (1993)
- Founder: James Tharin
- Headquarters: 404 South Wells Street; Suite 600; Chicago, Illinois 60607
- Key people: James Tharin; (Founder and CEO); Brian Blockovich; (President and General Counsel); Matt Murray; (Vice President of Sales); Dave Grondy; (Data Operations Manager); William Tomczak; (CFO)
- Website: www.chicagoclearing.com

Chicago Clearing Corporation (CCC) is a securities class action settlement claim-filing service based in Chicago, Illinois. Started in 1993 to buy and sell coupons issued at the end of class action settlements, the company now employs more than 20 staff members. CCC has over 1000 clients that include bank trust departments, hedge funds, mutual funds, registered investment advisers, professional traders, and insurance companies. This client base has approximately $2 trillion in AUM and more than 2,000,000 individual accounts.

== Corporate hierarchy ==
Established to better service the different types of class members in the Payment Card Settlement, the Chicago Clearing Family of Companies outlines CCC core family values.

- Chicago Clearing Corporation - Securities Class Actions
- Certificate Clearing Corporation - Coupon Class Actions
- Mitena Partners - Consumer Antitrust Class Actions
- Jackson Financial - Illiquid Asset Monetization

== Notable settlements ==
Chicago Clearing Corporation or CCC has grown extensively as the rate of securities class action settlements has exploded in recent years.

- BMW M5 Litigation - A lawsuit was filed by the buyers of the 1988 BMW M5 after the company produced more of what was supposed to be a limited-edition model. As part of this settlement in 1993, owners were issued a $4,000 voucher towards their next BMW car purchase. Chicago Clearing Corporation acted as a market maker and facilitated the buying and selling of these coupons in the same way as on the stock market.
- Linens Antitrust Litigation - In this landmark trial, the New York restaurant industry argued that the major suppliers of linens colluded to fix their prices at artificially high levels. This 2003 case resulted in both $6 million in cash and $3 million in vouchers being awarded to the prosecution. Chicago Clearing Corporation bought and sold these coupons as many of the former clients no longer wanted to do business with these suppliers.
- Bank of America - This securities class action litigation settled for $2.425 billion with a claim filing deadline on April 25, 2013. Bank of America failed to accurately report losses that it and Merrill Lynch had sustained between 2008 and 2009 while the two companies were in the process of merging. The stock price tumbled by nearly $8 and a government investment was required in order to finalize the merger. This is one of the biggest securities class actions settlement funds to come out of several pending financial meltdown cases from 2007 to 2009 and to date, CCC has filed for 500 institutional clients and over 52,000 individual accounts on this one case alone.
- Citigroup - Citigroup was forced to pay their investors $730 million due to allegedly reporting false figures on their statements. During the period of May 2006 until November 2008, the company also omitted many crucial sections of their debt and preferred stock disclosures. Much of the withheld information stemmed from issues dating back to the mortgage-backed securities crisis and Citigroup's overexposure to these types of assets. However, Citigroup still denies any wrongdoing and entered into the settlement in order to, "eliminate the uncertainties, burden and expense of further protracted litigation."
- Merck and Co. - Merck and Schering-Plough settled a $688 million lawsuit after the two companies merged in 2009. Both of these drug companies reportedly delayed showing poor tests results from their new cholesterol drugs in order to shield themselves from bigger issues during the acquisition process. When these findings were eventually revealed, many investors suffered as the stock price quickly fell. Holders of Merck received $215 million, while Schering-Plough investors received the bulk of the settlement in the form of $473 million. Not only were many members of CCC's client base affected by this settlement, but it also resulted in large payouts for many across the securities class action claim filing sector.

== See also ==
- Apple Inc. litigation
- Payment Card Settlement
