= 2026 Times Square stabbing =

Crime in New York City, United States

- Location: Times Square, New York City, US
- Date: August 31, 2026
- Attack type: Homicide by stabbing
- Weapon: Two knives
- Deaths: 2 (including the perpetrator)
- Injuries: 1
- Motive: Undisclosed, possibly psychosis

On August 31, 2026, a stabbing attack occurred in Times Square, Manhattan, New York City, United States. A woman, Bank of America vice president Erin Piacenti was killed, and a man was injured. Police shot and killed the perpetrator, 49-year-old Pamela Cisneros.

== Attack ==
Pamela Cisneros, a 49-year-old woman who had a history of mental health issues, stabbed two people in Times Square. She killed Erin Piacenti, who was a vice president of Bank of America, and critically injured a 68-year-old man. Police attempted to subdue Cisneros with stun guns, but two officers ultimately shot and killed her. The two victims and Cisneros were all taken to Bellevue Hospital, where Cisneros and Piacenti were pronounced dead.
