= Calibuso v. Bank of America Corp. =

2010 U.S. gender discrimination lawsuit

Calibuso et al. v. Bank of America and Merrill Lynch
- Court: United States District Court for the Eastern District of New York
- Verdict: $39 million settlement

Calibuso v. Bank of America Corp. is a class action lawsuit filed in 2010 against Bank of America, and its subsidiary Merrill Lynch, by female employees who alleged pervasive gender discrimination.

The suit was filed in United States District Court for the Eastern District of New York on March 30, 2010, by Judy Calibuso, a Miami financial adviser in Merrill Lynch, and Julie Moss and Dianne Goedtel, former financial advisers at Bank of America. The suit claimed companies of providing the male counterparts of the suing employees with "bigger bonuses and better opportunities and further detailed that one of the female employees was verbally scolded when she confronted the officials. The suit asked for "back pay", "unspecified damages" and "class-action status". In a statement, Shirley Norton, a Bank of America representative denied the accusations and labeled them as "false".

On September 6, 2013, a settlement worth $39 million was reached between the parties. It sorted out statements claimed by around 4,800 current and former female financial advisers which claimed that "women were paid less than men, deprived of handling their fair share of lucrative accounts, and faced retaliation if they complained." In addition to the financial settlement approved by Judge Pamela Chen, Bank of America agreed to three years of independent oversight intended to prevent similar discriminatory issues in the future.
