= Robbins Geller Rudman & Dowd LLP =

American law firm

- Headquarters: San Diego, CA
- No. of offices: 9
- No. of attorneys: 200
- No. of employees: 425
- Major practice areas: Securities, consumer, insurance, healthcare, human rights, employment discrimination, and antitrust
- Key people: Darren J. Robbins; Paul J. Geller; Samuel H. Rudman; Michael J. Dowd
- Company type: Limited liability partnership
- Website: http://www.rgrdlaw.com

Robbins Geller Rudman & Dowd LLP ("Robbins Geller") is an American law firm headquartered in San Diego, California. It is a plaintiffs law firm specializing in securities litigation and shareholder rights cases.

== History and notable cases ==
In 2010, the previous firm Coughlin Stoia Geller Rudman and Robbins ceased and Robbins Geller was formed. The founding attorneys were Darren J. Robbins, Paul J. Geller, Samuel H. Rudman, and Michael J. Dowd.

In 2011, the firm secured a $627 million settlement in In re Wachovia Preferred Sec. & Bond/Notes Litigation. The global recovery, including $590 million from Wells Fargo and $37 million from Wachovia's auditor, KPMG, was one of the largest recoveries under the Securities Act of 1933 arising out of the credit crisis. The suit focused on Wachovia's exposure to "pick-a-pay" loans, which the bank's offering materials assured were of "pristine credit quality." Investors alleged that these loans were made to subprime borrowers, many of whom defaulted, which ultimately led to a massive impairment of the bank's mortgage portfolio, and alleged that Wachovia's offering documents materially misstated and failed to disclose the true nature and quality of Wachovia's mortgage loan portfolio, which exposed the bank to tens of billions of dollars in losses on mortgage-related assets and misled investors. Robbins Geller was one of the firms appointed to represent the class.

In 2014, the firm obtained approval of a $590 million settlement with three private equity firms: Kohlberg Kravis Roberts, The Blackstone Group, and TPG Capital. The accusations were that the three firms colluded with one another to drive down the prices of corporate takeover targets. This resulted in investors receiving less per share for their shares in the target companies. The case was filed as Kirk Dahl, et al. v. Bain Capital Partners, LLC, et al.

In 2015, the firm obtained a $400 million class action settlement with Pfizer Inc. in Jones v. Pfizer Inc. Pfizer was accused of misleading investors in connection with off-label marketing, making false statements to shareholders, and making misleading statements about various government investigations.

In 2016, Robbins Geller obtained a settlement of $1.575 billion after 14 years of litigation in Jaffe v. Household Int'l, Inc. (now HSBC Finance).

In 2018, the firm represented the lead plaintiff in the $1 billion settlement in the In re American Realty Capital Properties, Inc. Litigation, a class action regarding alleged violations of Section 11 of the Securities Act of 1933.

The firm represents Tesla shareholders in a suit against the company's directors for its acquisition of SolarCity. In 2020, all board members except Elon Musk settled for $60 million. The firm previously sued Tesla officers and directors in 2013 over misrepresenting their financials and again in 2018 when Elon Musk tweeted he was taking the company private at $420 per share.

In 2023 the firm began representing shareholders in a class action lawsuit against pharmaceutical manufacturer Catalent Pharma Solutions with shareholders claiming violations of the Securities and Exchange Act of 1934. Shareholders who purchased stock between August 2021 and October 2022 and who want to file as lead plaintiffs in the suit have until April 25, 2023 to file a claim.

== Controversies ==
In 2014, the firm was sanctioned for filing a frivolous securities fraud lawsuit against Boeing related to the 787 Dreamliner airplane. In his sanction order, U.S. District Judge Rubén Castillo wrote that Robbins Geller "failed to verify the allegations so as to remain ignorant of the truth, and this conduct is reckless and unjustified."

In 2021, the firm was removed from a case by U.S. District Judge Louis Stanton for filing a "misleading" brief because the firm had failed to mention its former pension fund client actually made more money through investments in a fund that shorted the underlying asset. Stanton wrote, "In the world of securities law, that is a definition of fraud."

Ten days later, U.S. District Judge Gary Brown sharply criticized the firm for falsely claiming the court had jurisdiction over a securities class action: The firm filed the suit in Long Island but left out the fact that its clients were located in Manhattan and Oklahoma. The firm said the omission was inadvertent.

== Accolades ==
Robbins Geller and many of its attorneys have been recognized by various law publications and organizations.

- Best Lawyers selected Darren J. Robbins, Paul J. Geller, Michael J. Dowd, Patrick J. Coughlin, Spencer A. Burkholz, Travis E. Downs III, David W. Mitchell and Dennis J. Herman to its "2018 Best Lawyers in America" list, and named the firm one of the "Best Law Firms."
- The Legal 500 ranked Robbins Geller Tier 1 in "Securities Litigation: Plaintiff" and ranked the firm highly in "M&A Litigation: Plaintiff."
- The National Law Journal named Randall J. Baron as a 2016 M&A Trailblazer.
- The National Law Journal named the firm to its "Elite Trial Lawyers" finalist list in 2014-2016 and 2018, named the firm as the Securities Winner for 2016, and named the firm to its "Plaintiffs' Hot List" for 2004-2009, 2011, 2013-2014.
- Law360 named the firm as one of the nation's Securities Practice Groups of the Year for 2015-2017.
- U.S. News ranked Robbins Geller a National Tier 1 Firm for 2013-2018.
