= Bank of America =

American multinational banking and financial services corporation

Bank of America Corporation

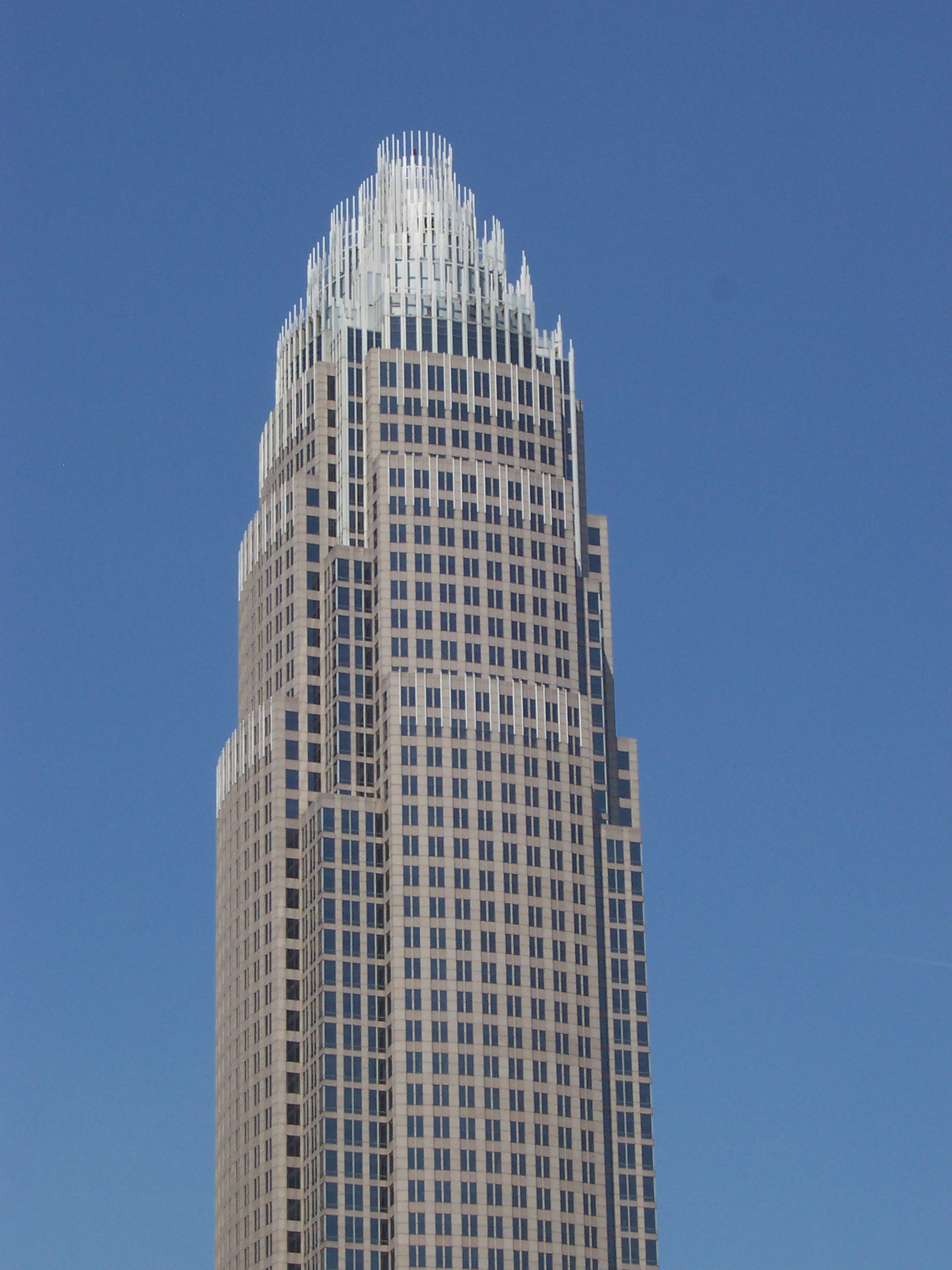
- Bank of America Corporate Center in April 2006
- Type: Public
- Traded as: NYSE: BAC; S&P 100 component; S&P 500 component
- ISIN: US0605051046
- Industry: Financial services
- Predecessors: BankAmerica; NationsBank
- Founded: 1998; 28 years ago (via the merger of BankAmerica & NationsBank)
- Headquarters: Bank of America Corporate Center, Charlotte, North Carolina, U.S. (corporate/legal) Bank of America Tower (Manhattan), New York City, U.S. (executive)
- Number of locations: c. 3,700 retail financial centers, c. 15,000 ATMs (2024)
- Area served: Worldwide
- Key people: Brian Moynihan (chairman and CEO); Bruce Thompson (vice chairman)
- Products: Asset management; Banking; Commodities; Credit cards; Equities trading; Insurance; Investment management; Mortgage loans; Private equity; Wealth management
- Revenue: ▲US$113.1 billion (2025)
- Operating income: ▲US$37.7 billion (2025)
- Net income: ▲US$30.5 billion (2025)
- AUM: ▲US$2.18 trillion (2025)
- Total assets: ▲US$3.41 trillion (2025)
- Total equity: ▲US$303 billion (2025)
- Owners: Berkshire Hathaway (7.9%)
- Number of employees: c. 213,000 (2025)
- Divisions: BofA Securities; Merrill; Bank of America Private Bank
- Website: bankofamerica.com

The Bank of America Corporation (Bank of America; often abbreviated BAC, BofA, or, less commonly, BOA) is an American multinational bank and financial services holding company headquartered at the Bank of America Corporate Center in Charlotte, North Carolina, with investment banking and auxiliary headquarters in Manhattan. The bank was formed by the merger of NationsBank and the legacy corporation of Bank of America in 1998. It is the second-largest banking institution in the United States by consolidated assets, after JPMorgan Chase. It is also the second-largest bank in the world by market capitalization, after JPMorgan Chase.

Among the Big Four banking institutions and one of eight systemically important financial institutions in the United States; it competes with JPMorgan Chase, Citigroup, and Wells Fargo. Its primary financial services revolve around commercial banking, wealth management, and investment banking.

Through past mergers, the oldest branch of the Bank of America franchise dates back to 1784, when Massachusetts Bank was chartered, becoming the first federally chartered joint-stock-owned bank in the United States. Another branch of its history goes back to the American-based Bank of Italy, founded by Amadeo Pietro Giannini in 1904, which provided various banking services to Italian immigrants who faced service discrimination at the time. Headquartered in San Francisco, California, Giannini helped develop and merged his interests with Bank of America, Los Angeles in the 1920s and the combined bank eventually did business as Bank of America.

In the 1950s, the passage of landmark federal banking legislation facilitated rapid growth, quickly establishing prominent shares for the present bank's predecessors. After suffering significant losses during the 1998 Russian financial crisis, BankAmerica, as it was then known, was acquired by the Charlotte-based NationsBank for $62 billion. Following what was then the largest bank acquisition in history, the Bank of America Corporation was founded. Through a series of mergers and acquisitions, it built upon its commercial banking business by establishing Merrill Lynch for wealth management and Bank of America Merrill Lynch for investment banking in 2008 and 2009, respectively, and since renamed BofA Securities.

As of 2018, the investment bank was considered within the "bulge bracket" as the world's third-largest investment bank. Its wealth management unit then managing $1.08 trillion in assets under management (AUM) as the second-largest wealth manager in the world, after UBS. In commercial banking, Bank of America has operations, but does not maintain retail branches in all 50 states of the United States, Washington, D.C., and over 40 other countries.

The bank's large market share, business activities, and economic impact have led to numerous lawsuits and investigations regarding both mortgages and financial disclosures dating back to the 2008 financial crisis. Its corporate practices of servicing the middle class and wider banking community have yielded a substantial market share since the early 20th century. As of August 2018, Bank of America has a $313.5 billion market capitalization, making it the 13th largest company in the world.

== History ==
Bank of America, Los Angeles, was founded in California in 1923, with San Francisco banker A.P. Giannini taking a minority position. In 1928, this entity was acquired by Giannini's Bank of Italy (founded in San Francisco, 1904), which took the Bank of America name two years later.

The eastern portion of the Bank of America franchise can be traced to 1784, when the Massachusetts Bank was chartered, the first federally chartered joint-stock owned bank in the United States and only the second bank to receive a charter in their country. This bank became FleetBoston, with which Bank of America merged in 2004. In 1874, Commercial National Bank was founded in Charlotte. That bank merged with American Trust Company in 1958 to form American Commercial Bank. Two years later, it became North Carolina National Bank when it merged with Security National Bank of Greensboro. In 1991, it merged with C&S/Sovran Corporation of Atlanta and Norfolk to form NationsBank.

The central portion of the franchise dates to 1910, when Commercial National Bank of Illinois and Continental National Bank of Chicago merged to form Continental & Commercial National Bank, which evolved into Continental Illinois National Bank & Trust.

=== Early history ===
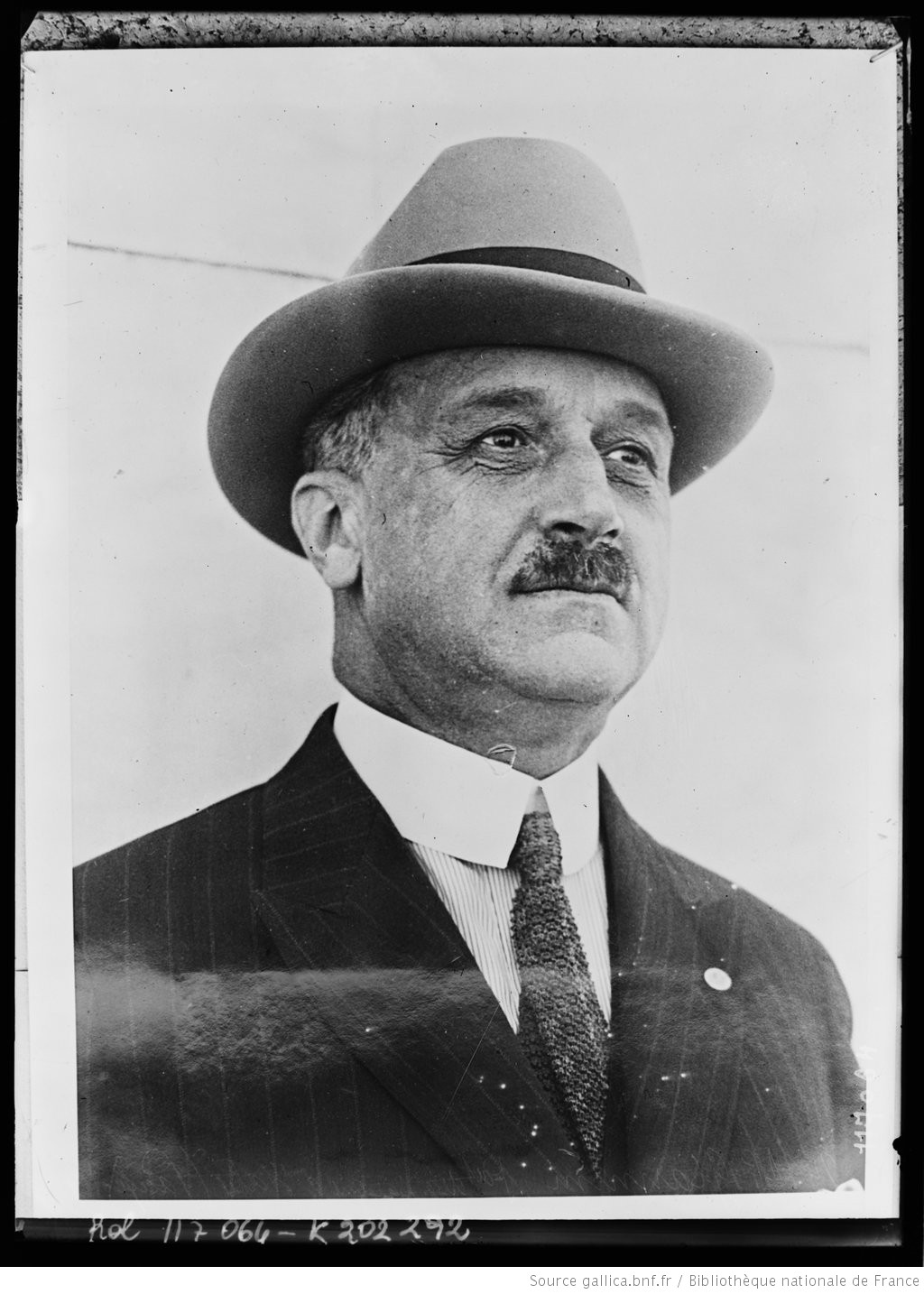
Amadeo Giannini, founder of the Bank of Italy, in 1927

The history of Bank of America dates to October 17, 1904, when Amadeo Giannini founded the Bank of Italy in San Francisco. In 1922, the Bank of America, Los Angeles, was established with Giannini as a minority investor. The two banks merged in 1928 and, through further consolidations to become the largest banking institution in the country.

In 1928, Bank of Italy merged with Bank of America, Los Angeles. The following year, New York City investment bank, Blair & Co., merged with Bank of America. The Bank of Italy was renamed on November 3, 1930, to Bank of America National Trust and Savings Association, with Giannini and Monnette as co-chairs. By 1929, the bank had 453 banking offices in California with aggregate resources of over US$1.4 billion. Giannini sought to build a national bank, expanding into most of the western states, as well as into the insurance industry, under his holding company, Transamerica Corporation.

In 1953, regulators succeeded in forcing the separation of Transamerica Corporation and Bank of America under the Clayton Antitrust Act.

New technologies enabled the direct linking of credit cards with individual bank accounts, so that, in 1958, the bank introduced its BankAmericard, later renamed Visa, in 1977.

From February 1970 through September 1971, there were 66 attacks on Bank of America branches in California, including 53 bombings or fire-bombings, and 13 arson fires. There were "few injuries" and the property damage cost about $500,000, 80% of which was from the burning of the Isla Vista branch during a February 1970 riot.

==== Expansion outside California ====
Bank of America's logo from 1969 to 1998

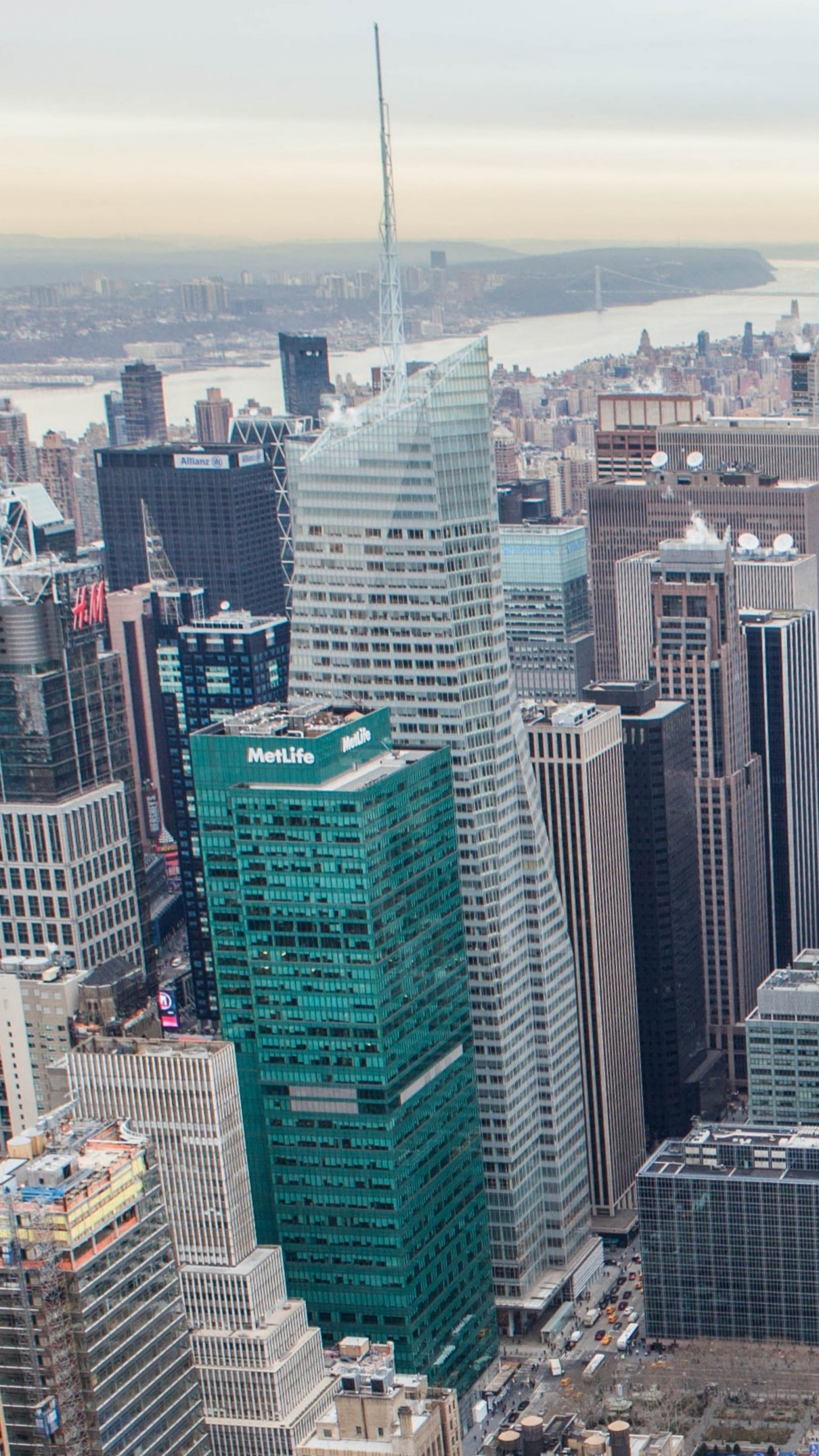
Bank of America Tower, headquarters for Bank of America's investment banking operations, seen from Bryant Park in Midtown Manhattan, in 2015

Following the passage of the Bank Holding Company Act of 1956 by the U.S. Congress, BankAmerica Corporation was established for the purpose of owning and operating Bank of America and its subsidiaries.

In 1983, Bank of America expanded outside California, through acquisition of Seafirst Corporation in Seattle and its wholly owned banking subsidiary, Seattle-First National Bank.

BankAmerica experienced huge losses in 1986 and 1987 due to the placement of a series of bad loans in the Third World. In 1992, the company acquired Security Pacific Corporation and its subsidiary Security Pacific National Bank in California and other banks in Arizona, Idaho, Oregon, and Washington, which Security Pacific had acquired in a series of acquisitions in the late 1980s. This represented, at the time, the largest bank acquisition in history.

The series of mergers helped BankAmerica Corporation to once again become the largest U.S. bank holding company in terms of deposits, but the company fell to second place in 1997 behind North Carolina's fast-growing NationsBank Corporation, and to third in 1998 behind First Union Corp.

On the capital markets side, the acquisition of Continental Illinois helped BankAmerica to build a leveraged finance origination- and distribution business, which allowed the firm's existing broker-dealer, BancAmerica Securities (originally named BA Securities), to become a full-service franchise. In addition, in 1997, BankAmerica acquired Robertson Stephens, a San Francisco–based investment bank specializing in high technology for $540 million. Robertson Stephens was integrated into BancAmerica Securities, and the combined subsidiary was renamed "BancAmerica Robertson Stephens".

=== Merger of NationsBank and BankAmerica, 1998 ===
Bank of America's logo used from 1998 to 2018

In 1997, BankAmerica lent investment management firm D. E. Shaw & Co. $1.4 billion to run various businesses for the bank. However, D.E. Shaw suffered significant losses during the 1998 Russian financial crisis. NationsBank of Charlotte acquired BankAmerica in 1998 in what was the largest bank acquisition in history at that time.

While NationsBank was the nominal survivor, the merged bank took the better-known name of Bank of America. Hence, the holding company was renamed Bank of America Corporation, while NationsBank, N.A., merged with Bank of America NT&SA to form Bank of America, N.A. as the remaining legal bank entity. The combined bank operates under Federal Charter 13044, which was granted to Giannini's Bank of Italy on March 1, 1927. However, the merged company was and still is headquartered in Charlotte, and retains NationsBank's pre-1998 stock price history. All U.S. Securities and Exchange Commission (SEC) filings before 1998 are listed under NationsBank, not Bank of America. NationsBank president, chairman, and CEO Hugh McColl took on the same roles with the merged company.

In 1998, Bank of America possessed combined assets of $570 billion, as well as 4,800 branches in 22 U.S. states. Despite the size of the two companies, federal regulators insisted only upon the divestiture of 13 branches in New Mexico, in towns that would be left with only a single bank following the combination. These branches were sold to BOK Financial Corporation, which operates them under the name "Bank of Albuquerque". The broker-dealer, NationsBanc Montgomery Securities, was named Banc of America Securities in 1998.

=== Banc of America Securities subsidiary ===
Banc of America Securities
- Type: Subsidiary
- ISIN: US0605051046
- Industry: Financial services
- Founded: 1998
- Defunct: 2008
- Successor: Bank of America Merrill Lynch
- Headquarters: New York City, US
- Key people: Kenneth D. Lewis, President
- Revenue: 101,887,000,000 United States dollar (2024)
- Operating income: 18,995,000,000 United States dollar (2020)
- Net income: 27,132,000,000 United States dollar (2024)
- Total assets: 3,180,151,000,000 United States dollar (2023)
- Number of employees: 209,000 (2017)
- Website: www.bofasecurities.com

Banc of America Securities LLC (BAS) was the investment banking subsidiary of BoA from 1998 until BoA was merged with Merrill Lynch (2008). Headquartered in New York City, the company competed in both the domestic and international equity and investment banking markets. The company was a registered broker-dealer with the United States Securities and Exchange Commission (SEC) and was a member of the New York Stock Exchange and the National Association of Securities Dealers. The use of "Banc" in the BAS's name was indicative of the fact that the company was not a bank, and its deposits and other holdings were not insured by the Federal Deposit Insurance Corporation.

The subsidiary was founded in 1998 following a strategy pioneered by Citigroup that combines corporate lending with investment banking advice and services. During its years of operation, its strongest investment banking groups included high-yield debt underwriting and Leveraged Finance, in addition to industry coverage groups such as Healthcare, Consumer & Retail, Global Industries, Media & Telecom, Financial Institutions, Real Estate, and Gaming. It also had a massive equities and derivatives group led by John Sandelman. The group was later led by Chris Innes from 2002 to 2006 (in 2001, Innes was instrumental in a deal kept private that generated $100 million in fees for the bank adjusted ($US191 million in 2025), the largest equities derivative deal of all time. Innes had become one of the youngest managing directors in the firm's history at 27, and made Global Head of Equities, Derivatives, and Prime Brokerage at 32 before leaving to launch his own hedge fund. BAS also did a significant amount of work for Financial Sponsors, or private equity firms, often financing leveraged transactions. On the product side, the firm employed M&A senior bankers throughout the industry coverage groups. BAS also had a stand-alone Mergers & Acquisitions Group, consisting of bankers that transact M&A deals across all industries, as well as a Transaction Development Group, which aimed to identify and market transaction opportunities. The unit also had sizeable fixed income, currency, and commodities divisions.

During 2007–2008, BAS significantly downsized its international operations, eliminating a number of industry groups in Europe, as well as cutting numerous banking and sales and trading positions in North America and Asia prior to its merger with Merrill Lynch. On October 3, 2008, Bank of America announced that John Thain would lead the combined Bank of America/Merrill Lynch Global Corporate and Investment Banking enterprise. Thain was forced out by Bank of America Chairman Kenneth D. Lewis on January 22, 2009, because of the colossal losses visited on B of A due to its acquisition of Merrill Lynch. With Thain's departure, Brian Moynihan became president of Global Banking and Global Wealth and Investment Management. After the merger was closed, the SEC Registration of Banc of America Securities was terminated in January 2011.

BAS operated from a number of offices across the world, with major offices in New York, New York, Charlotte, North Carolina, Chicago, Illinois, San Francisco, California, Tokyo, Frankfurt, London, and Mumbai. The bulk of its investment banking operations eventually moved to the Bank of America Tower, a $1 billion, 58-story skyscraper, at Bryant Park in New York City that was completed in 2009. Prior to that, BAS in New York had offices in various locations due to the numerous mergers that had taken place over the previous decade, including space at 9 West 57th Street, 1 World Trade Center, 1633 Broadway, 40 East 52nd Street, 335 Madison Avenue, and 100 West 33rd Street.

=== 2005 to 2007 ===
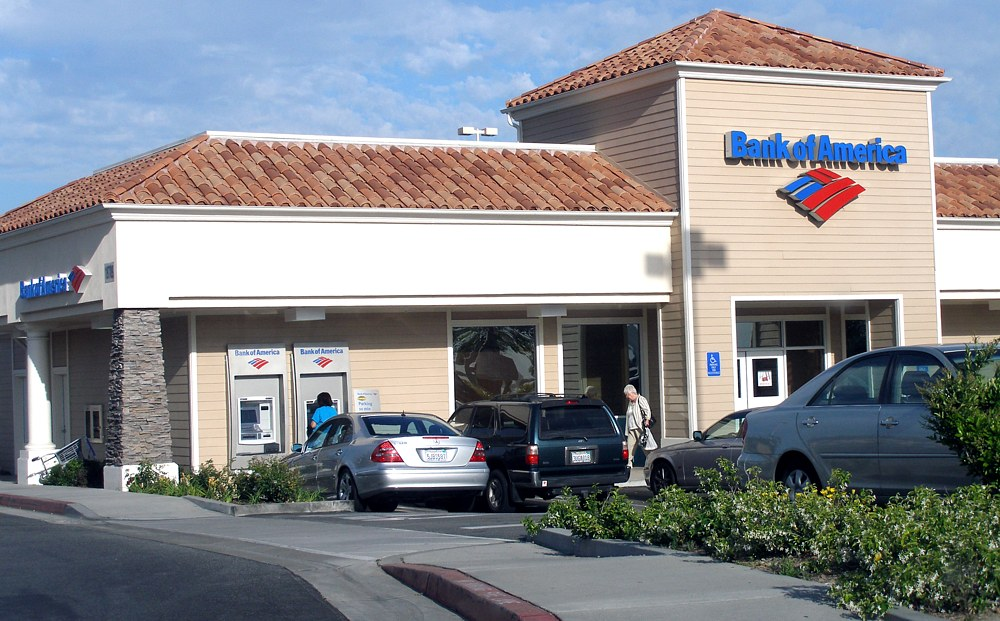
A typical Bank of America branch in Los Angeles

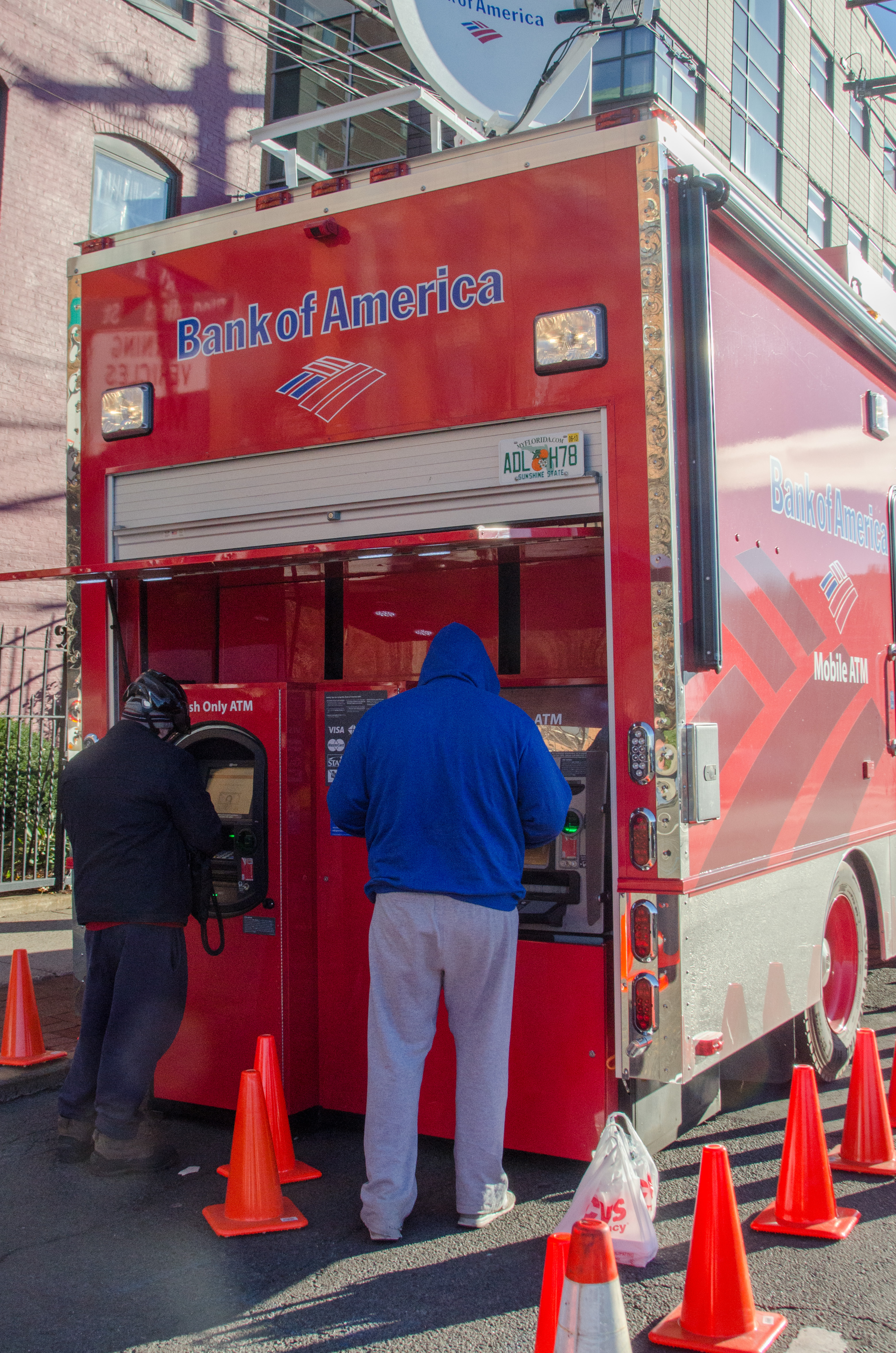
Emergency ATMs were put in place in Hoboken, New Jersey, following Hurricane Sandy in 2012.

In 2001, McColl stepped down as CEO and named Ken Lewis as his successor. In 2004, Bank of America announced it would purchase Boston-based bank FleetBoston Financial for $47 billion in cash and stock. By merging with Bank of America, all of its banks and branches were given the Bank of America logo. At the time of the merger, FleetBoston was the seventh-largest bank in the United States with $197 billion in assets, over 20 million customers, and revenue of $12 billion. Hundreds of FleetBoston workers lost their jobs or were demoted, according to The Boston Globe.

On June 30, 2005, Bank of America announced it would purchase credit card giant MBNA for $35 billion in cash and stock. The Federal Reserve Board gave final approval to the merger on December 15, 2005, and the merger closed on January 1, 2006. The acquisition of MBNA provided Bank of America with a leading domestic and foreign credit card issuer. The combined Bank of America Card Services organization, including the former MBNA, had more than 40 million U.S. accounts and nearly $140 billion in outstanding balances. Under Bank of America, the operation was renamed FIA Card Services.

Bank of America operated under the name BankBoston in many other Latin American countries, including Brazil. In May 2006, Bank of America and Banco Itaú (Investimentos Itaú S.A.) entered into an acquisition agreement, through which Itaú agreed to acquire BankBoston's operations in Brazil, and was granted an exclusive right to purchase Bank of America's operations in Chile and Uruguay, in exchange for Itaú shares. The deal was signed in August 2006.

Before the transaction, BankBoston's Brazilian operations included asset management, private banking, a credit card portfolio, and small, middle-market, and large corporate segments. It had 66 branches and 203,000 clients in Brazil. BankBoston in Chile had 44 branches and 58,000 clients, and in Uruguay, it had 15 branches. In addition, there was a credit card company, OCA, in Uruguay, which had 23 branches. BankBoston N.A. in Uruguay, together with OCA, jointly served 372,000 clients. While the BankBoston name and trademarks were not part of the transaction, as part of the sale agreement, they cannot be used by Bank of America in Brazil, Chile, or Uruguay following the transactions. Hence, the BankBoston name has disappeared from Brazil, Chile, and Uruguay. The Itaú stock received by Bank of America in the transactions has allowed Bank of America's stake in Itaú to reach 11.51%. Banco de Boston de Brazil had been founded in 1947.

On November 20, 2006, Bank of America announced the purchase of The United States Trust Company for $3.3 billion from the Charles Schwab Corporation. US Trust had about $100 billion of assets under management and over 150 years of experience. The deal closed July 1, 2007.

On September 14, 2007, Bank of America won approval from the Federal Reserve to acquire LaSalle Bank Corporation from ABN AMRO for $21 billion. With this purchase, Bank of America possessed $1.7 trillion in assets. A Dutch court blocked the sale until it was later approved in July. The acquisition was completed on October 1, 2007. Many of LaSalle's branches and offices had already taken over smaller regional banks within the previous decade, such as Lansing and Detroit-based Michigan National Bank. The acquisition also included the Chicago Marathon event, which ABN AMRO acquired in 1996. Bank of America took over the event starting with the 2007 race.

The deal increased Bank of America's presence in Illinois, Michigan, and Indiana by 411 branches, 17,000 commercial bank clients, 1.4 million retail customers, and 1,500 ATMs. Bank of America became the largest bank in the Chicago market with 197 offices and 14% of the deposit share, surpassing JPMorgan Chase.

LaSalle Bank and LaSalle Bank Midwest branches adopted the Bank of America name on May 5, 2008.

=== 2007–2010 (Subprime mortgage crisis) ===
During the subprime mortgage crisis, the bank, under Ken Lewis, made two major acquisitions that would shape the future of the company for the next couple of years coming out of the crisis. Specifically, the bank was sued by many different parties and made to pay tens of billions of dollars.

==== Acquisition of Countrywide Financial ====
On August 23, 2007, the company announced a $2 billion repurchase agreement for Countrywide Financial. This purchase of preferred stock was arranged to provide a return on investment of 7.25% per annum and provided the option to purchase common stock at a price of $18 per share.

On January 11, 2008, Bank of America announced that it would buy Countrywide Financial for $4.1 billion. In March 2008, it was reported that the Federal Bureau of Investigation (FBI) was investigating Countrywide for possible fraud relating to home loans and mortgages. This news did not hinder the acquisition, which was completed in July 2008, giving the bank a substantial market share of the mortgage business, and access to Countrywide's resources for servicing mortgages. The acquisition was seen as preventing a potential bankruptcy for Countrywide. Countrywide, however, denied that it was close to bankruptcy. Countrywide provided mortgage servicing for nine million mortgages valued at $1.4 trillion as of December 31, 2007.

This purchase made Bank of America Corporation the leading mortgage originator and servicer in the U.S., controlling 20–25% of the home loan market. The deal was structured to merge Countrywide with the Red Oak Merger Corporation, which Bank of America created as an independent subsidiary. It has been suggested that the deal was structured this way to prevent a potential bankruptcy stemming from large losses in Countrywide, hurting the parent organization by keeping Countrywide's bankruptcy remote. Countrywide Financial has changed its name to Bank of America Home Loans.

In December 2011, the Justice Department announced a $335 million settlement with Bank of America over discriminatory lending practices at Countrywide Financial. Attorney General Eric Holder said a federal probe found discrimination against qualified African-American and Latino borrowers from 2004 to 2008. He said that minority borrowers who qualified for prime loans were steered into higher-interest-rate subprime loans.

==== Acquisition of Merrill Lynch ====
Chart showing the trajectory of Bank of America's share value and transaction volume during the 2008 financial crisis

On September 14, 2008, Bank of America announced its intention to purchase Merrill Lynch & Co., Inc. in an all-stock deal worth approximately $50 billion. Merrill Lynch was at the time within days of collapse, and the acquisition effectively saved Merrill from bankruptcy. Around the same time Bank of America was reportedly also in talks to purchase Lehman Brothers, however a lack of government guarantees caused the bank to abandon talks with Lehman. Lehman Brothers filed for bankruptcy the same day Bank of America announced its plans to acquire Merrill Lynch. This acquisition made Bank of America the largest financial services company in the world. Temasek Holdings, the largest shareholder of Merrill Lynch & Co., Inc., briefly became one of the largest shareholders of Bank of America, with a 3% stake. However, taking a loss Reuters estimated at $3 billion, the Singapore sovereign wealth fund sold its whole stake in Bank of America in the first quarter of 2009.

Shareholders of both companies approved the acquisition on December 5, 2008, and the deal closed January 1, 2009. Bank of America had planned to retain various members of the then Merrill Lynch's CEO, John Thain's management team after the merger. However, after Thain was removed from his position, most of his allies left. The departure of Nelson Chai, who had been named Asia-Pacific president, left just one of Thain's hires in place: Tom Montag, head of sales and trading.

The bank, in its January 16, 2009, earnings release, revealed massive losses at Merrill Lynch in the fourth quarter, which necessitated an infusion of money that had previously been negotiated with the government as part of the government-persuaded deal for the bank to acquire Merrill. Merrill recorded an operating loss of $21.5 billion in the quarter, mainly in its sales and trading operations, led by Tom Montag. The bank also disclosed it tried to abandon the deal in December after the extent of Merrill's trading losses surfaced, but was compelled to complete the merger by the U.S. government. The bank's stock price sank to $7.18, its lowest level in 17 years, after announcing earnings and the Merrill mishap. The market capitalization of Bank of America, including Merrill Lynch, was then $45 billion, less than the $50 billion it offered for Merrill just four months earlier, and down $108 billion from the merger announcement.

Bank of America CEO Kenneth Lewis testified before Congress that he had some misgivings about the acquisition of Merrill Lynch and that federal official pressured him to proceed with the deal or face losing his job and endangering the bank's relationship with federal regulators.

Lewis's statement is backed up by internal emails subpoenaed by Republican lawmakers on the House Oversight Committee. In one of the emails, Richmond Federal Reserve President Jeffrey Lacker threatened that if the acquisition did not go through, and later Bank of America were forced to request federal assistance, the management of Bank of America would be "gone". Other emails, read by Congressman Dennis Kucinich during the course of Lewis' testimony, state that Mr. Lewis had foreseen the outrage from his shareholders that the purchase of Merrill would cause, and asked government regulators to issue a letter stating that the government had ordered him to complete the deal to acquire Merrill. Lewis, for his part, states he didn't recall requesting such a letter.

The acquisition made Bank of America the number one underwriter of global high-yield debt, the third largest underwriter of global equity and the ninth largest adviser on global mergers and acquisitions. As the credit crisis eased, losses at Merrill Lynch subsided, and the subsidiary generated $3.7 billion of Bank of America's $4.2 billion in profit by the end of quarter one in 2009, and over 25% in quarter 3 2009.

On September 28, 2012, Bank of America settled the class-action lawsuit over the Merrill Lynch acquisition and will pay $2.43 billion. This was one of the first major securities class action lawsuits stemming from the 2008 financial crisis to settle. Many major financial institutions had a stake in this lawsuit, including Chicago Clearing Corporation, hedge funds, and bank trusts, due to the belief that Bank of America stock was a sure investment.

==== Federal Troubled Asset Relief Program ====
On January 16, 2009, Bank of America received $20 billion and a guarantee of $118 billion in potential losses from the U.S. government through the Troubled Asset Relief Program (TARP). This was in addition to the $25 billion given to the bank in the fall of 2008 through TARP. The additional payment was part of a deal with the U.S. government to preserve Bank of America's merger with Merrill Lynch. Since then, members of the U.S. Congress have expressed considerable concern about how this money has been spent, especially since some of the recipients have been accused of misusing the bailout money. Then CEO Ken Lewis was quoted as claiming "We are still lending, and we are lending far more because of the TARP program." Members of the U.S. House of Representatives, however, were skeptical and quoted many anecdotes about loan applicants (particularly small business owners) being denied loans and credit card holders facing stiffer terms on the debt in their card accounts.

According to an article in The New York Times published on March 15, 2009, Bank of America received an additional $5.2 billion in government bailout money via the bailout of American International Group.

As a result of its federal bailout and management problems, The Wall Street Journal reported that the Bank of America was operating under a secret "memorandum of understanding" (MOU) from the U.S. government that requires it to "overhaul its board and address perceived problems with risk and liquidity management". With the federal action, the institution has taken several steps, including arranging for six of its directors to resign and forming a Regulatory Impact Office. Bank of America faces several deadlines in July and August and if not met, could face harsher penalties by federal regulators. Bank of America did not respond to The Wall Street Journal story.

On December 2, 2009, Bank of America announced it would repay the entire $45 billion it received in TARP and exit the program, using $26.2 billion of excess liquidity along with $18.6 billion to be gained in "common equivalent securities" (Tier 1 capital). The bank announced it had completed the repayment on December 9. Bank of America's Ken Lewis said during the announcement, "We appreciate the critical role that the U.S. government played last fall in helping to stabilize financial markets, and we are pleased to be able to fully repay the investment, with interest.... As America's largest bank, we have a responsibility to make good on the taxpayers' investment, and our record shows that we have been able to fulfill that commitment while continuing to lend."

==== Bonus settlement ====
On August 3, 2009, Bank of America agreed to pay a $33 million fine, without admission or denial of charges, to the U.S. Securities and Exchange Commission (SEC) over the non-disclosure of an agreement to pay up to $5.8 billion of bonuses at Merrill. The bank approved the bonuses before the merger but did not disclose them to its shareholders when the shareholders were considering approving the Merrill acquisition, in December 2008. The issue was originally investigated by New York Attorney General Andrew Cuomo, who commented after the suit and announced a settlement that "the timing of the bonuses, as well as the disclosures relating to them, constituted a 'surprising fit of corporate irresponsibility'" and "our investigation of these and other matters pursuant to New York's Martin Act will continue". Congressman Kucinich commented at the same time that "This may not be the last fine that Bank of America pays for how it handled its merger of Merrill Lynch." A federal judge, Jed Rakoff, in an unusual action, refused to approve the settlement on August 5. A first hearing before the judge on August 10 was at times heated, and he was "sharply critic[al]" of the bonuses. David Rosenfeld represented the SEC, and Lewis J. Liman, son of Arthur L. Liman, represented the bank. The actual amount of bonuses paid was $3.6 billion, of which $850 million was "guaranteed" and the rest was shared among 39,000 workers who received average payments of $91,000; 696 people received more than $1 million in bonuses; at least one person received a more than $33 million bonus.

On September 14, the judge rejected the settlement and told the parties to prepare for trial to begin no later than February 1, 2010. The judge focused much of his criticism on the fact that the fine in the case would be paid by the bank's shareholders, who were the ones that were supposed to have been injured by the lack of disclosure. He wrote, "It is quite something else for the very management that is accused of having lied to its shareholders to determine how much of those victims' money should be used to make the case against the management go away," ... "The proposed settlement," the judge continued, "suggests a rather cynical relationship between the parties: the S.E.C. gets to claim that it is exposing wrongdoing on the part of the Bank of America in a high-profile merger; the bank's management gets to claim that they have been coerced into an onerous settlement by overzealous regulators. And all this is done at the expense, not only of the shareholders but also of the truth."

While ultimately deferring to the SEC, in February 2010, Judge Rakoff approved a revised settlement with a $150 million fine "reluctantly", calling the accord "half-baked justice at best" and "inadequate and misguided". Addressing one of the concerns he raised in September, the fine will be "distributed only to Bank of America shareholders harmed by the non-disclosures, or 'legacy shareholders, an improvement on the prior $33 million while still "paltry", according to the judge. Case: SEC v. Bank of America Corp., 09-cv-06829, United States District Court for the Southern District of New York. Investigations also were held on this issue in the United States -9House Committee on Oversight and Government Reform, under chairman Edolphus Towns (D-NY) and in its investigative Domestic Policy Subcommittee under Kucinich.

==== Fraud ====
In 2010, the U.S. government accused the bank of defrauding schools, hospitals, and dozens of state and local government organizations via misconduct and illegal activities involving the investment of proceeds from municipal bond sales. As a result, the bank agreed to pay $137.7 million, including $25 million to the Internal Revenue Service and $4.5 million to the state attorney general, to the affected organizations to settle the allegations. Former bank official Douglas Campbell pleaded guilty to antitrust, conspiracy, and wire fraud charges. As of January 2011, other bankers and brokers are under indictment or investigation.

On October 24, 2012, the top federal prosecutor in Manhattan filed a lawsuit alleging that Bank of America fraudulently cost American taxpayers more than $1 billion when Countrywide Financial sold toxic mortgages to Fannie Mae and Freddie Mac. The scheme was called 'Hustle', or High Speed Swim Lane. On May 23, 2016, the Second U.S. Circuit Court of Appeals ruled that the finding of fact by the jury that low quality mortgages were supplied by Countrywide to Fannie Mae and Freddie Mac in the "Hustle" case supported only "intentional breach of contract", not a fraud. The action, for civil fraud, relied on provisions of the Financial Institutions Reform, Recovery and Enforcement Act. The decision turned on lack of intent to defraud at the time the contract to supply mortgages was made.

==== Change of CEO ====
Ken Lewis, who had lost the title of chairman of the board, announced that he would retire as CEO effective December 31, 2009, in part due to controversy and legal investigations concerning the purchase of Merrill Lynch. Brian Moynihan became president and CEO effective January 1, 2010, and afterward credit card charge offs and delinquencies declined in January. Bank of America also repaid the $45 billion it had received from the Troubled Assets Relief Program.

=== 2011 to present ===
==== Downsizing (2011 to 2014) ====
During 2011, Bank of America began conducting personnel reductions of an estimated 36,000 people, contributing to intended savings of $5 billion per year by 2014. In December 2011, Forbes ranked Bank of America's financial wealth 91st out of the nation's largest 100 banks and thrift institutions.

Bank of America cut around 16,000 jobs in a quicker fashion by the end of 2012 as revenue continued to decline because of new regulations and a slow economy. This put a plan one year ahead of time to eliminate 30,000 jobs under a cost-cutting program, called Project New BAC. In the first quarter of 2014, Berkshire Bank purchased 20 Bank of America branches in Central and eastern New York for 14.4 million dollars. The branches were from Utica/Rome region and down the Mohawk Valley east to the capital region. In April and May 2014, Bank of America sold two dozen branches in Michigan to Huntington Bancshares. The locations were converted to Huntington National Bank branches in September.

As part of its new strategy Bank of America is focused on growing its mobile banking platform. As of 2014, Bank of America has 31 million active online users and 16 million mobile users. Its retail banking branches have decreased to 4,900 as a result of increased mobile banking use and a decline in customer branch visits. By 2018, the number of mobile users has increased to 25.3 million and the number of locations fell to 4,411 at the end of June.

==== Sale of stake in China Construction Bank ====
In 2005, Bank of America acquired a 9% stake in China Construction Bank, one of the Big Four banks in China, for US$3 billion. It represented the company's largest foray into China's growing banking sector. Bank of America has offices in Hong Kong, Shanghai, and Guangzhou and was looking to greatly expand its Chinese business as a result of this deal. In 2008, Bank of America was awarded Project Finance Deal of the Year at the 2008 ALB Hong Kong Law Awards. In November 2011, Bank of America announced plans to divest most of its stake in the China Construction Bank.

In September 2013, Bank of America sold its remaining stake in the China Construction Bank for as much as $1.5 billion, marking the firm's full exit from the country.

==== $17 billion settlement with Justice Department ====
In August 2014, Bank of America agreed to a near–$17 billion deal to settle claims against it relating to the sale of toxic mortgage-linked securities including subprime home loans, in what was believed to be the largest settlement in U.S. corporate history. The bank agreed with the U.S. Justice Department to pay $9.65 billion in fines, and $7 billion in relief to the victims of the faulty loans which included homeowners, borrowers, pension funds and municipalities. Real estate economist Jed Kolko said the settlement is a "drop in the bucket" compared to the $700 billion in damages done to 11 million homeowners. Since the settlement covered such a substantial portion of the market, he said for most consumers "you're out of luck".

Much of the government's prosecution was based on information provided by three whistleblowers – Shareef Abdou (a senior vice president at the bank), Robert Madsen (a professional appraiser employed by a bank subsidiary), and Edward O'Donnell (a Fannie Mae official). The three men received $170 million in whistleblower awards.

==== Decision not to finance makers of military-style guns ====
In April 2018, Bank of America announced that it would stop providing financing to makers of military-style weapons such as the AR-15 rifle.

==== Return to expansion (2015–present) ====
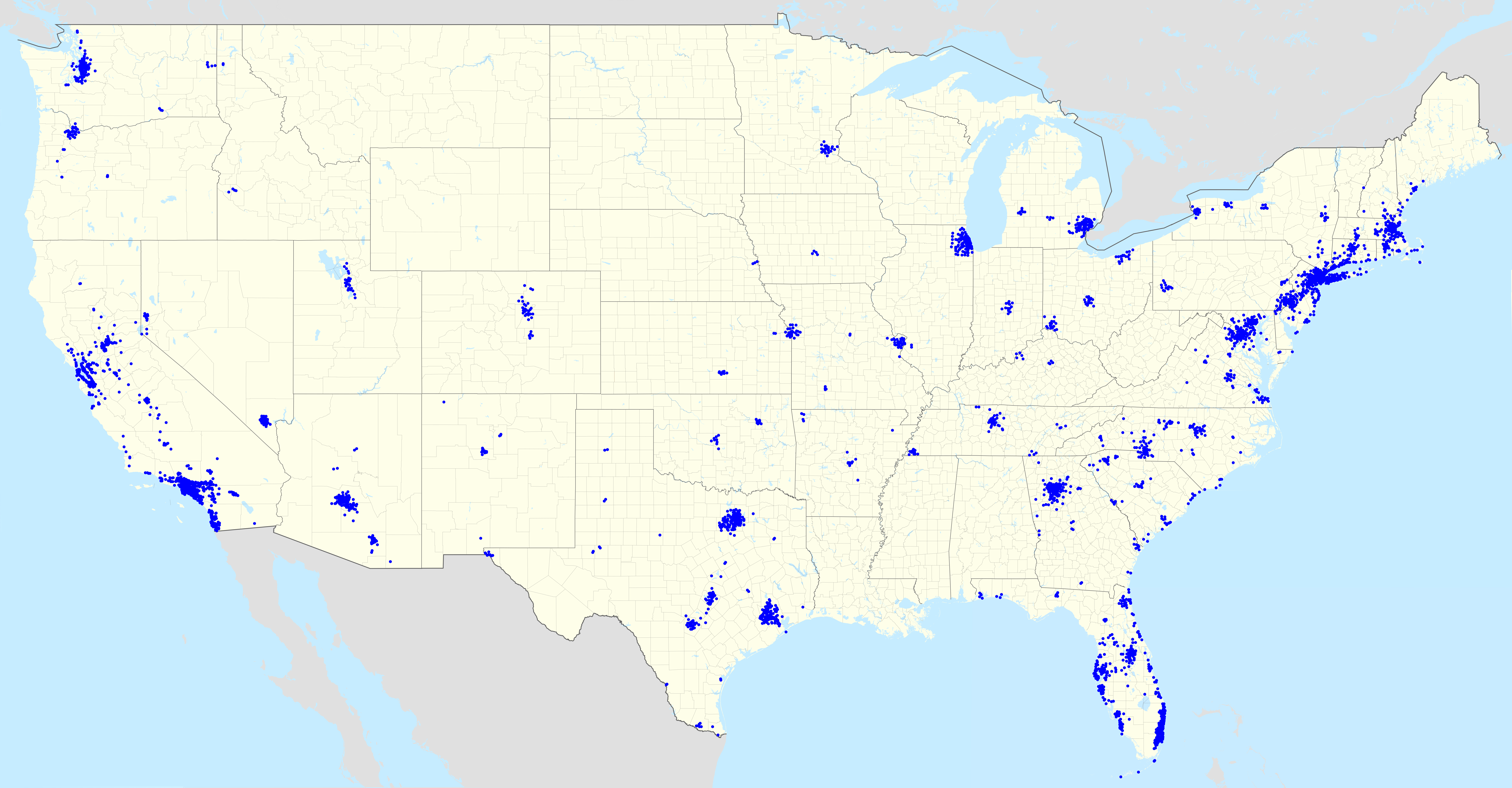
Bank of America's footprint as of February 2026

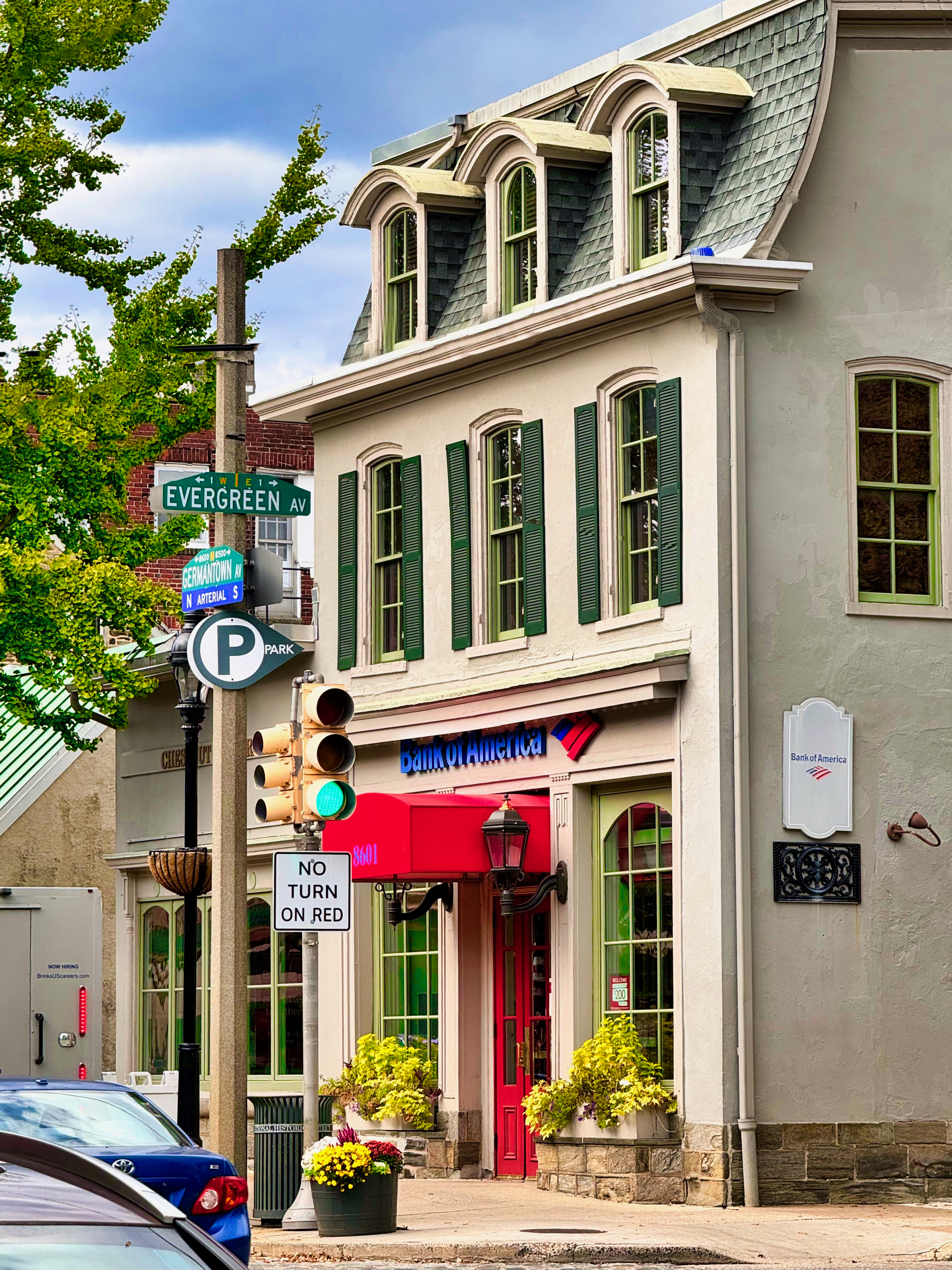
A Bank of America branch in the Chestnut Hill section of Philadelphia

In 2015, Bank of America began expanding organically, opening branches in cities where it previously did not have a retail presence. They started that year in Denver, followed by Minneapolis–Saint Paul and Indianapolis, in all cases having at least one of its Big Four competitors, with Chase Bank being available in Denver and Indianapolis, while Wells Fargo is available in Denver and the Twin Cities. The Twin Cities market is also the home market of U.S. Bancorp, the largest non-Big Four rival.

In January 2018, Bank of America announced an organic expansion of its retail footprint into Pittsburgh and surrounding areas, to supplement its existing commercial lending and investment businesses in the area. Before the expansion, Pittsburgh had been one of the largest US cities without a retail presence by any of the Big Four, with locally based PNC Financial Services (no. 6 nationally) having a commanding market share in the area; this coincided with Chase making a similar expansion into Pittsburgh. By the end of the fiscal year 2020, Bank of America had become Pittsburgh's 16th largest bank by deposits, which considering the dominance of PNC and BNY Mellon in the market is considered relatively impressive. By 2021, Bank of America had moved up to 12th in the market.

In February 2018, Bank of America announced it would expand into Ohio across the state's three biggest cities (Cleveland, Columbus, and Cincinnati), which are strongholds of Chase. Columbus serves as the bank's hub in Ohio due to its central location as the state's capital, its overall size and growth, and an existing Bank of America call center for its credit card division in suburban Westerville. Within a year of entering Ohio, Columbus quickly saw the bank become the 5th largest in the market by deposits, behind only banks either based in Ohio (Fifth Third Bank and locally based Huntington Bancshares) or that have a major presence as a result of an acquisition of an Ohio-based institution (Chase and PNC), and ahead of US Bancorp (also with a large presence due to acquiring an Ohio-based bank), Ohio-based KeyBank, and several local institutions.

As the sixth-largest American public company, Bank of America garnered $102.98 billion in sales as of June 2018. It was ranked number 25 on the 2020 Fortune 500 rankings of the largest US corporations by total revenue. It was named the "World's Best Bank" by Euromoney Institutional Investor in its 2018 Awards for Excellence. Bank of America ranked No. 6 on Forbes' 2023 Global 2000 rankings.

In January 2020, Bank of America hired new advisors whose primary functions are to assist ultra-wealthy clients.

During a 2018–2025 Federal Reserve asset cap imposed on Wells Fargo, Bank of America grew by over 40 percent.

On January 31, 2024, Bank of America declared a regular quarterly cash dividend of $0.24 per share, payable on March 29, 2024, to shareholders of record as of March 1, 2024.

On April 16, 2024, BoA shares fell over 3% following its first-quarter earnings report, which showed a decline in net income and an increase in provisions for credit losses.

In January 2026, The Wall Street Journal reported that an investigation by India's financial regulator found Bank of America had improperly shared non-public information regarding a $180 million block stock trade and subsequently misled authorities during the inquiry.

In March 2026, Bank of America poached four top tech bankers as it sought to expand its market share in tech deal-making.

In August 2026, Bank of America entered into a joint venture agreement with Jio Financial Services to acquire up to a 49.9% stake in its non-banking financial subsidiary, Jio Credit, for ₹18,268 crore (then approximately $US1.9 billion).

On September 14, 2026, Bank of America shares fell 5.1% to $59.47, marking the stock's largest single day decline since April 2025. The drop followed statements by Chief Executive Officer Brian Moynihan indicating that third-quarter investment banking revenue was expected to decline by at least 10% year-over-year, while sales and trading revenue was projected to remain flat.

In November 2026, Stewart Barry was reported to be leaving his role as Bank of America's vice chairman to join Allen & Company as a senior banker on the West Coast. Barry led BOA's global internet group, working with major internet companies. he joined the bank in 2014 and was based in the San Francisco Bay Area.

== Operations ==
Bank of America generates 90% of its revenues in its domestic market. The core of its strategy is to be the top bank in its domestic market, achieved through key acquisitions.

=== Consumer Banking ===
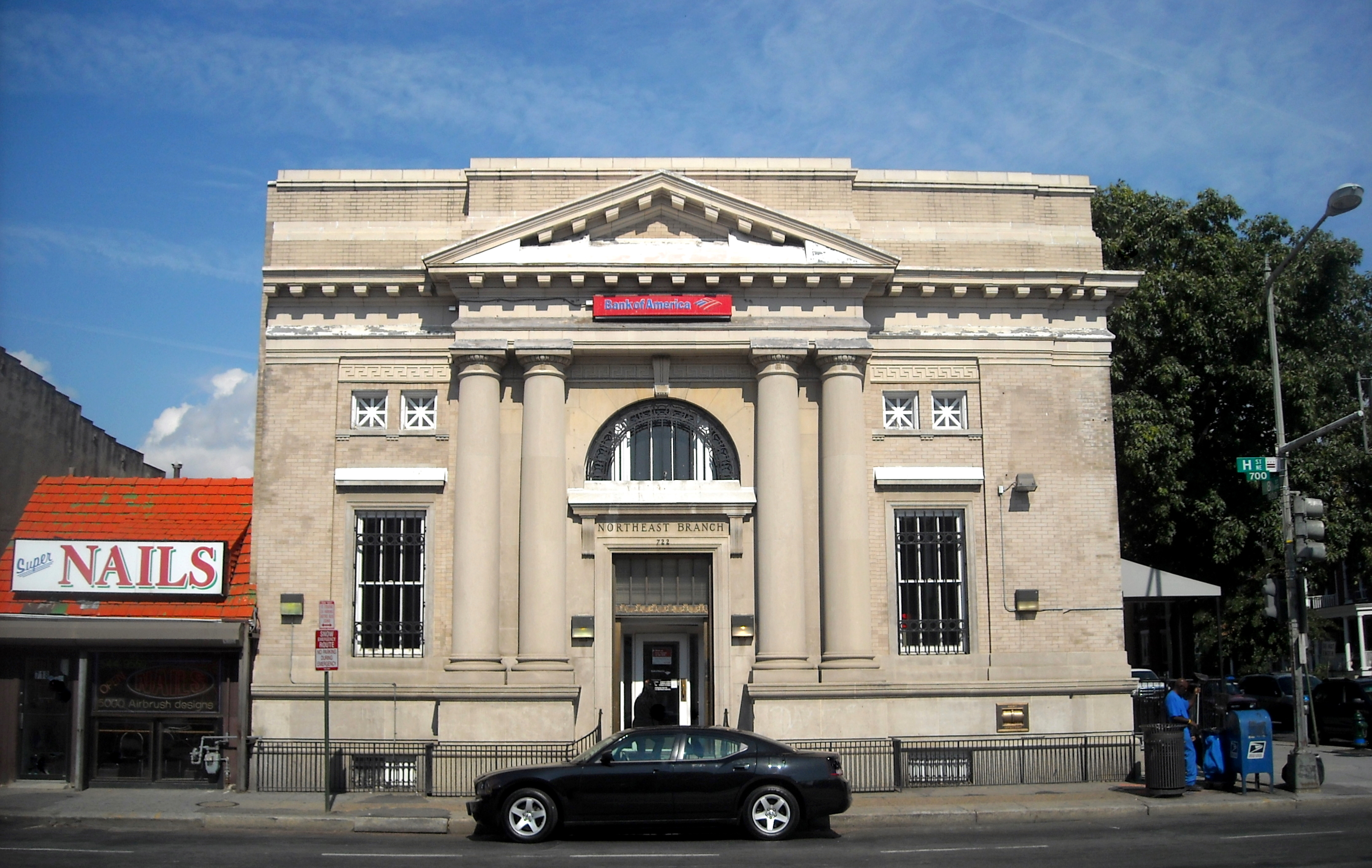
A Bank of America branch in Washington, D.C.

Consumer Banking, the largest division in the company, provides financial services to consumers and small businesses including, banking, investments, merchant services, and lending products including business loans, mortgages, and credit cards. It provides stockbroker services via Merrill Edge, a specific division for investment and related services, such as research and call center counsel, after Merrill Lynch became a subsidiary of Bank of America. The consumer banking division represented 38% of the company's total revenue in 2016. The company earns revenue from interest income, service charges, and fees. In addition, the company is a mortgage servicer. It competes primarily with the retail banking arms of America's three other megabanks: Citigroup, JPMorgan Chase, and Wells Fargo. As of September 30, 2026, the Consumer Banking organization included approximately 3,500 retail financial centers and approximately 15,000 ATMs.

Bank of America is a member of the Global ATM Alliance, a joint venture of several major international banks that provides for reduced fees for consumers using their ATM card or check card at another bank within the Global ATM Alliance when travelling internationally. This feature is restricted to withdrawals using a debit card and users are still subject to foreign currency conversion fees, credit card withdrawals are still subject to cash advance fees and foreign currency conversion fees.

=== Global Banking ===
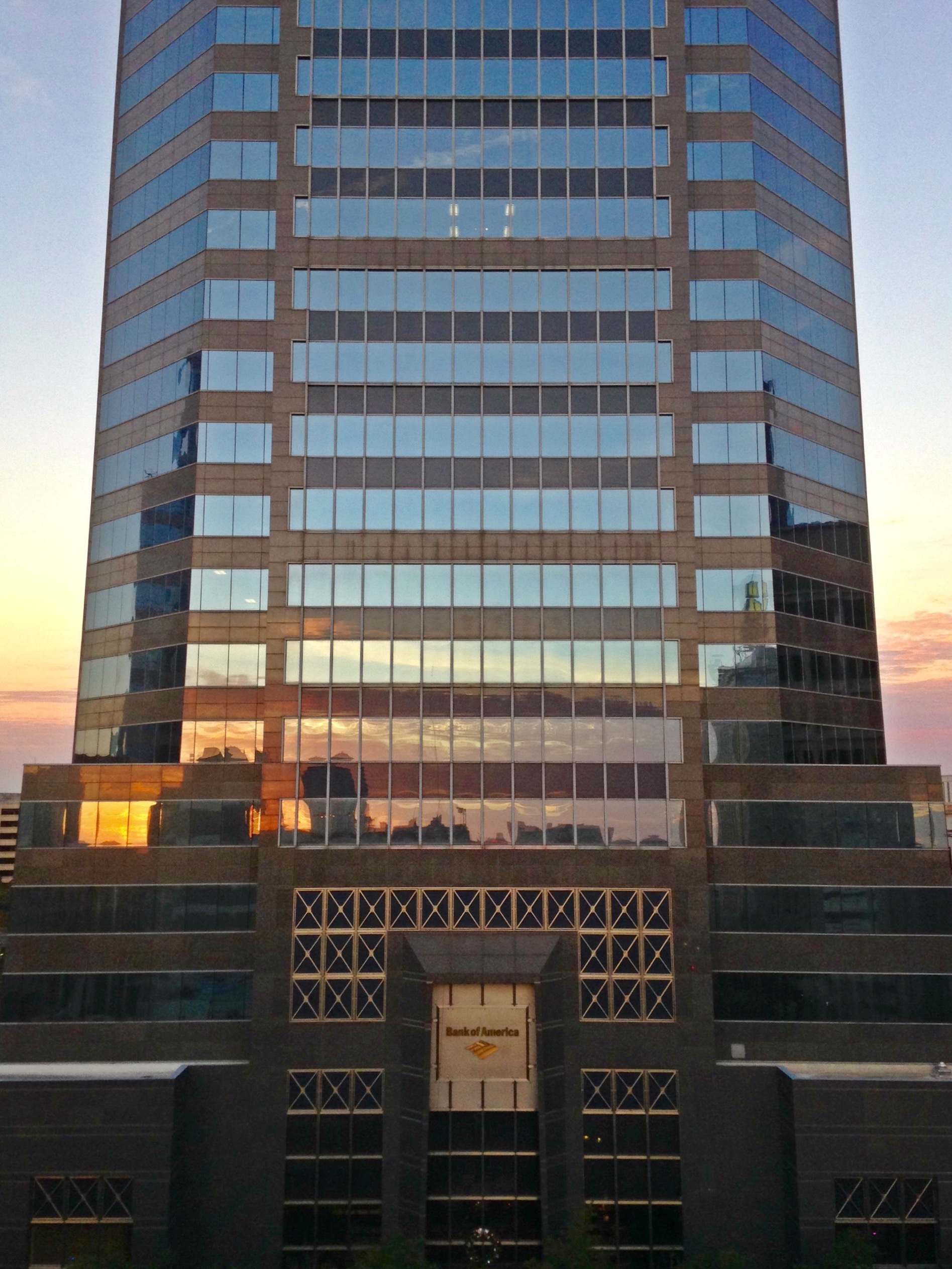
Bank of America Tower, on Laura Street in Jacksonville, Florida

The Global Banking division provides banking services, including investment banking and lending products to businesses. It includes the businesses of Global Corporate Banking, Global Commercial Banking, Business Banking, and Global Investment Banking. The division represented 22% of the company's revenue in 2016.

Before Bank of America's acquisition of Merrill Lynch, the Global Corporate and Investment Banking (GCIB) business operated as Banc of America Securities LLC. The bank's investment banking activities operate under the Merrill Lynch subsidiary and provided mergers and acquisitions advisory, underwriting, capital markets, as well as sales & trading in fixed income and equities markets. Its strongest groups include Leveraged Finance, Syndicated Loans, and mortgage-backed securities. It also has one of the largest research teams on Wall Street. Bank of America Merrill Lynch is headquartered in New York City.

=== Global Wealth and Investment Management ===
The Global Wealth and Investment Management (GWIM) division manages the investment assets of institutions and individuals. It includes the businesses of Merrill Lynch Global Wealth Management and U.S. Trust and represented 21% of the company's total revenue in 2016. It is among the 10 largest U.S. wealth managers. It has over $2.5 trillion in client balances. GWIM has five primary lines of business: Premier Banking & Investments (including Bank of America Investment Services, Inc.), The Private Bank, Family Wealth Advisors, and Bank of America Specialist.

=== Global Markets ===
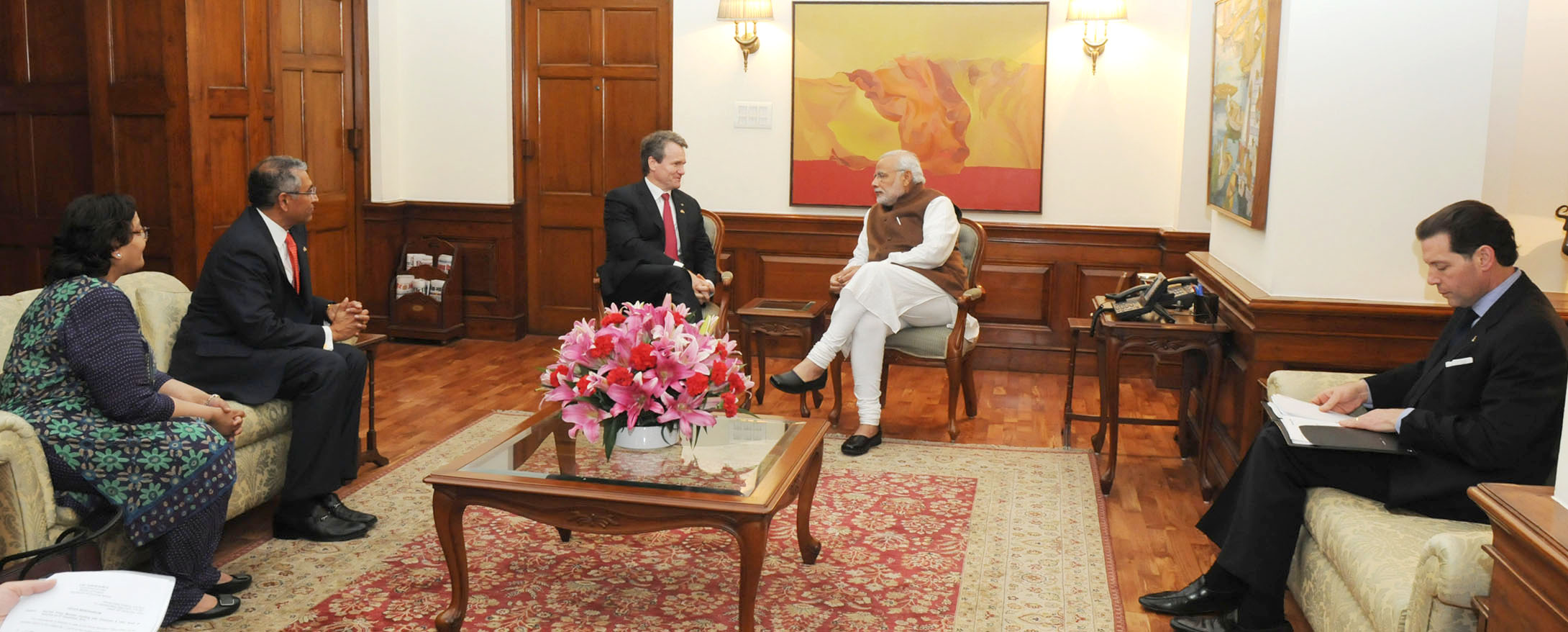
Bank of America CEO Brian Moynihan met Narendra Modi, Prime Minister of India, in New Delhi in December 2014.

The Global Markets division offers services to institutional clients, including trading in financial securities. The division provides research and other services such as securities service, market maker, and risk management using derivatives. The division represented 19% of the company's total revenues in 2016.

=== Labor ===
On April 9, 2019, the company announced minimum wage will be increased beginning May 1, 2019, to $17.00 an hour until it reaches a goal of $20.00 an hour in 2021.

=== Offices ===
The Bank of America principal executive offices are located in the Bank of America Corporate Center, Charlotte, North Carolina. The skyscraper is located at 100 North Tryon Street, and stands at 871 ft (265 m), having been completed in 1992.

In 2012, Bank of America cut ties to the American Legislative Exchange Council (ALEC).

==== International offices ====
Bank of America's Global Corporate and Investment Banking has its U.S. headquarters in Charlotte, European headquarters in Dublin, and Asian headquarters in Hong Kong and Singapore.

== Chief executive officer ==
=== List of CEOs ===
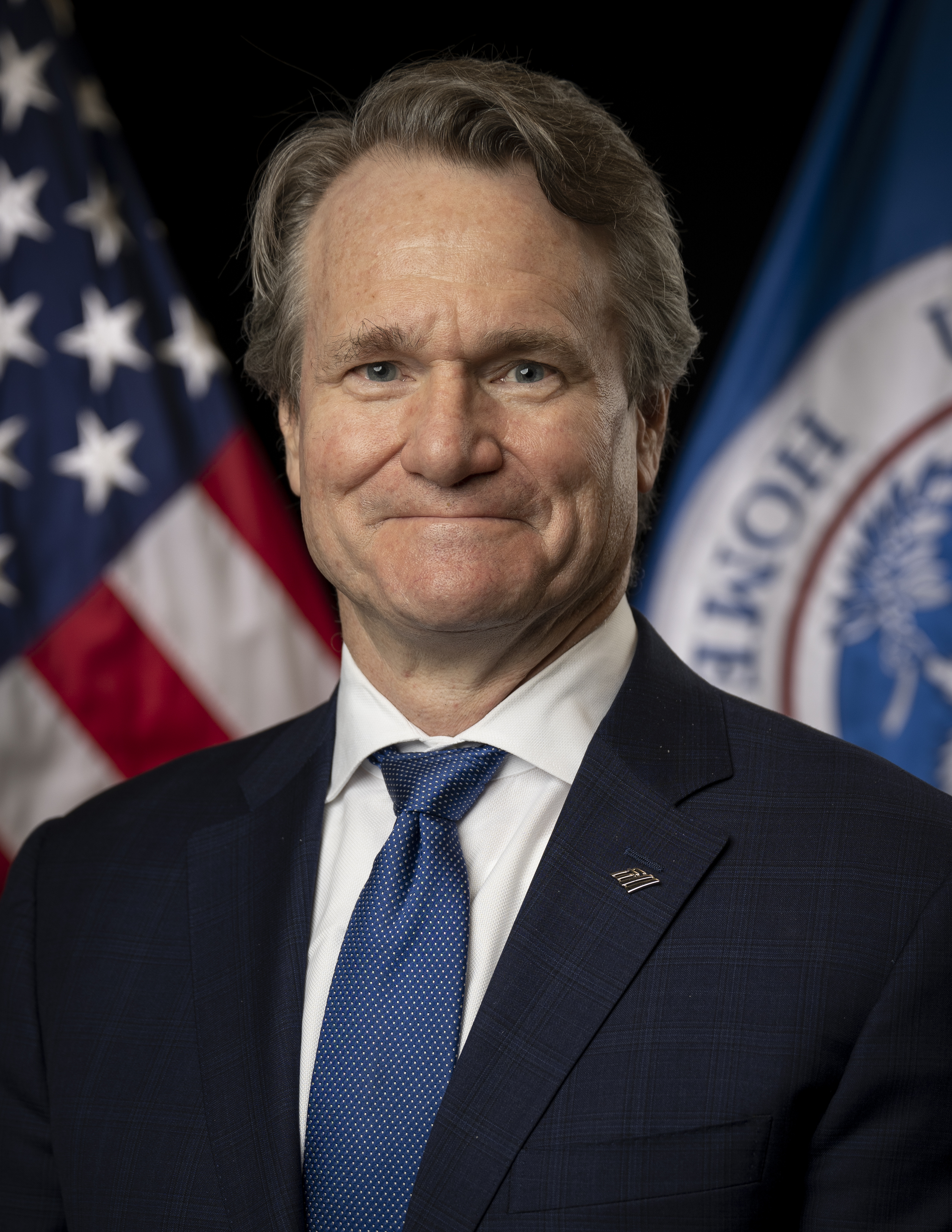
Brian Moynihan, Bank of America CEO since 2010

1. Hugh McColl (1998–2001)
2. Ken Lewis (2001–2009)
3. Brian Moynihan (2010– )

== Charitable efforts ==
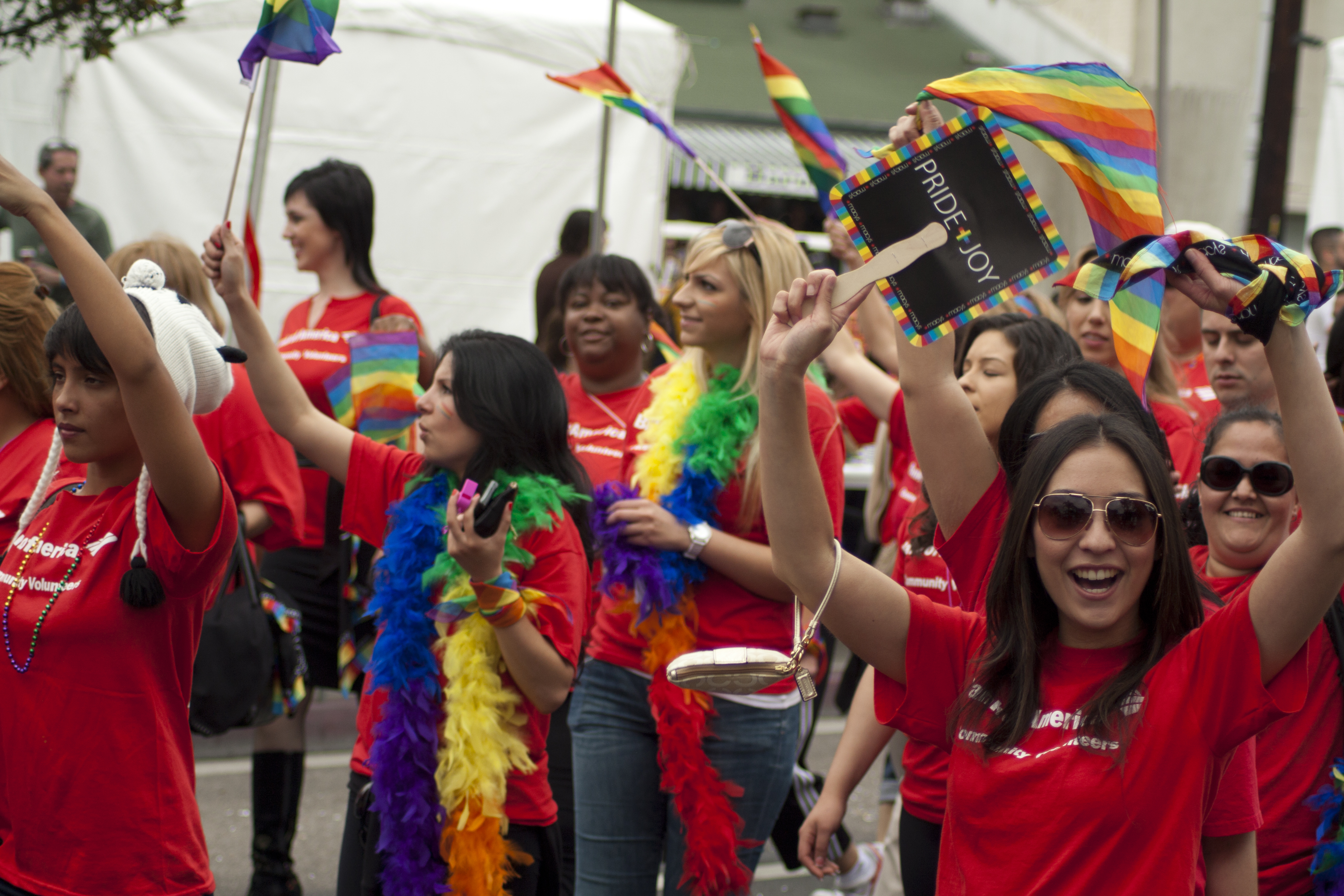
Bank of America volunteers at an LGBT pride parade in Los Angeles in 2011

In 1998, the bank made a ten-year commitment of $350 billion to provide affordable mortgages, build affordable housing, support small businesses and create jobs in disadvantaged neighbourhoods. In 2004, the bank pledged $750 million over a ten-year period for community development lending and affordable housing programs.

In 2007, the bank offered employees a $3,000 rebate for the purchase of hybrid vehicles. The company also provided a $1,000 rebate or a lower interest rate for customers whose homes qualified as energy efficient. In 2007, Bank of America partnered with Brighter Planet to offer an eco-friendly credit card, and later a debit card, which help build renewable energy projects with each purchase. Bank of America has also donated money to help health centers in Massachusetts and made a $1 million donation in 2007 to help homeless shelters in Miami.

In India, Bank of America donates to the preservation and documentation of relics. Since 2010, under the stewardship of Kaku Nakhate, president and head of BoA India, the company has supported arts and culture in the country, including sponsoring the Children's Museum at CSMVS (Chhatrapati Shivaji Maharaj Vastu Sangrahalaya, formerly known as Prince of Wales Museum).

== Lawsuits, controversies, and incidents ==
=== Lawsuits ===
==== Parmalat lawsuit ====
Parmalat SpA is a multinational Italian dairy and food corporation. Following Parmalat's 2003 bankruptcy, the company sued Bank of America for $10 billion, alleging the bank profited from its knowledge of Parmalat's financial difficulties. The parties announced a settlement in July 2009, resulting in Bank of America paying Parmalat $98.5 million in October 2009. In a related case, on April 18, 2011, an Italian court acquitted Bank of America and three other large banks, along with their employees, of charges they assisted Parmalat in concealing its fraud, and of lacking sufficient internal controls to prevent such frauds. Prosecutors did not immediately say whether they would appeal the rulings. In Parma, the banks were still charged with covering up the fraud.

==== Mortgage abuses ====
In August 2011, Bank of America was sued for $10 billion by American International Group over an alleged "massive fraud" on mortgage debt. Another lawsuit filed against Bank of America, pertained to $57.5 billion in mortgage-backed securities Bank of America sold to Fannie Mae and Freddie Mac. That December, Bank of America agreed to pay $335 million to settle a federal government claim that Countrywide Financial had discriminated against Hispanic and African-American homebuyers from 2004 to 2008, prior to being acquired by BofA. In September 2012, BofA settled out of court for $2.4 billion in a class action lawsuit filed by BofA shareholders who felt they were misled about the purchase of Merrill Lynch.

On February 9, 2012, it was announced that the five largest mortgage servicers (Ally/GMAC, Bank of America, Citi, JPMorgan Chase, and Wells Fargo) agreed to a historic settlement with the federal government and 49 states. The settlement, known as the National Mortgage Settlement (NMS), required the servicers to provide about $26 billion in relief to distressed homeowners and indirect payments to the states and the federal government. This settlement amount makes the NMS the second largest civil settlement in U.S. history, only trailing the Tobacco Master Settlement Agreement. The five banks were also required to comply with 305 new mortgage servicing standards. Oklahoma held out and agreed to settle with the banks separately.

On October 24, 2012, American federal prosecutors filed a $1 billion civil lawsuit against Bank of America for mortgage fraud under the False Claims Act, which provides for possible penalties of triple the damages suffered. The government asserted that Countrywide, which was acquired by Bank of America, rubber-stamped mortgage loans to risky borrowers and forced taxpayers to guarantee billions of bad loans through Fannie Mae and Freddie Mac. The suit was filed by Preet Bharara, the United States attorney in Manhattan, the inspector general of FHFA and the special inspector for the Troubled Asset Relief Program. In March 2014, Bank of America settled the suit by agreeing to pay $6.3 billion to Fannie Mae and Freddie Mac and to buy back around $3.2 billion worth of mortgage bonds.

A $7.5 million settlement was reached in April 2014 with former chief financial officer for Bank of America, Joe L. Price, over allegations that the bank's management withheld material information related to its 2008 merger with Merrill Lynch. In August 2014, the United States Department of Justice and the bank agreed to a $16.65 billion agreement over the sale of risky, mortgage-backed securities before the Great Recession; the loans behind the securities were transferred to the company when it acquired banks such as Merrill Lynch and Countrywide in 2008. As a whole, the three firms provided $965 billion of mortgage-backed securities from 2004 to 2008. The settlement was structured to give $7 billion in consumer relief and $9.65 billion in penalty payments to the federal government and state governments; California, for instance, received $300 million to recompense public pension funds. The settlement was the largest in United States history between a single company and the federal government.

==== Settlement with homeowners ====
On March 14, 2011, members of hacker group Anonymous began releasing emails said to be from a former Bank of America employee. According to the group, the emails documented alleged "corruption and fraud". The source, identified publicly as Brian Penny, was a former LPI Specialist from Balboa Insurance, a firm which used to be owned by the bank, but was sold to Australian Reinsurance Company QBE. On April 7, 2014, Bank of America and QBE settled a class-action lawsuit stemming from the leak for $228 million.

==== Unfair billing practices ====
In April 2014, the Consumer Financial Protection Bureau (CFPB) ordered Bank of America to provide an estimated $727 million in relief to consumers harmed by practices related to credit card add-on products. According to the Bureau, roughly 1.4 million customers were affected by deceptive marketing of add-on products, and 1.9 million customers were illegally charged for credit monitoring and reporting services they were not receiving. The deceptive marketing misconduct involved telemarketing scripts containing misstatements and off-script sales pitches made by telemarketers that were misleading and omitted pertinent information. The unfair billing practices involved billing customers for privacy-related products without having the authorization necessary to perform the credit monitoring and credit report retrieval services. As a result, the company billed customers for services they did not receive, unfairly charged consumers for interest and fees, illegally charged approximately 1.9 million accounts, and failed to provide the product benefit. In May 2022, CFPB ordered Bank of America to pay $10 million in penalties for illegal garnishments.

==== Misusing Customer Cash and Putting Customer Securities at Risk ====
In June 2016 the U.S. Securities and Exchange Commission "announced that Merrill Lynch has agreed to pay $415 million and admit wrongdoing to settle charges that it misused customer cash to generate profits for the firm and failed to safeguard customer securities from the claims of its creditors.

An SEC investigation found that Merrill Lynch violated the SEC’s Customer Protection Rule by misusing customer cash that rightfully should have been deposited in a reserve account. Merrill Lynch engaged in complex options trades that lacked economic substance and artificially reduced the required deposit of customer cash in the reserve account. The maneuver freed up billions of dollars per week from 2009 to 2012 that Merrill Lynch used to finance its own trading activities. Had Merrill Lynch failed in the midst of these trades, the firm’s customers would have been exposed to a massive shortfall in the reserve account.

In addition to the Customer Protection Rule violations, Merrill Lynch violated Exchange Act Rule 21F-17 by using language in severance agreements that operated to impede employees from voluntarily providing information to the SEC. The SEC’s investigation was conducted by Jeff Leasure and James Murtha with assistance from Eli Bass and Michael Birnbaum. The case was supervised by Mr. Osnato and Daniel Michael."

==== Discrimination ====
In 2018, former senior executive Omeed Malik filed a $100 million arbitration case through FINRA against Bank of America after the company investigated him for alleged sexual misconduct. His defamation claim was on the basis of retaliation, breach of contract, and discrimination against his Muslim background. Malik received an eight-figure settlement in July of the same year.

==== South African currency manipulation ====
In April 2015, the Competition Commission lodged an investigation into cartel conduct by major banks in the foreign currency exchange market affecting the South African rand. The investigation included Bank of America along with other banks including Barclays Bank Plc, CitiGroup Inc, JP Morgan Chase & Co, Standard New York Securities Inc and others. The above traders in foreign currencies are under investigation for directly or indirectly fixing prices on bids, offers and bid-offer spreads with regard to spot, futures and forwards currency trades. The conduct under investigation has the effect of distorting foreign exchange prices and artificially inflating the cost of trading in foreign currency, in relation to the rand.

==== Fake accounts, junk fees and withheld rewards ====
In 2023, the Consumer Financial Protection Bureau said that a total of $250 million in fines and compensation has been levied against Bank of America for "deceptive practices that harmed hundreds of thousands of consumers", including double charging insufficient funds fees, withholding credit card rewards, and opening accounts without the knowledge or permission of customers.

=== Controversies ===
==== Consumer credit controversies ====
In January 2008, Bank of America began notifying some customers without payment problems that their interest rates were more than doubled, up to 28%. The bank was criticized for raising rates on customers in good standing, and for declining to explain why it had done so. In September 2009, a Bank of America credit card customer, Ann Minch, posted a video on YouTube criticizing the bank for raising her interest rate. After the video went viral, she was contacted by a Bank of America representative who lowered her rate. The story attracted national attention from television and internet commentators. In 2010, the bank was criticized for allegedly seizing three properties that were not under their ownership, apparently due to incorrect addresses on their legal documents.

==== State of Arizona investigation ====
In 2010 the state of Arizona launched an investigation into Bank of America for misleading homeowners who sought to modify their mortgage loans. According to the attorney general of Arizona, the bank "repeatedly has deceived" such mortgagors. In response to the investigation, the bank has given some modifications on the condition that the homeowners remove some information criticizing the bank online.

==== Investment in coal mining ====
On May 6, 2015, Bank of America announced it would reduce its financial exposure to coal companies. The announcement came following pressure from universities and environmental groups. The new policy was announced as part of the bank's decision to continue to reduce credit exposure over time to the coal mining sector.

==== Jeffrey Epstein-related lawsuit ====
On 15 October 2025, a class-action lawsuit against Bank of America alleging its reckless disregard in its financial relationship with Jeffrey Epstein was filed.

In February 2026, a U.S. federal judge ruled that parts of a civil lawsuit against Bank of America could proceed, stating that allegations of the bank’s “reckless disregard” were sufficient to support claims under the Trafficking Victims Protection Act. The lawsuit alleged that Bank of America provided banking services to Jeffrey Epstein despite warning signs, and that the bank knowingly benefited from its relationship with him. While some claims were dismissed, the judge allowed key trafficking-related allegations against the bank to move forward. Bank of America denied wrongdoing.

==== Insider trading ====
The SEC charged Jason Satsky, a former co-head of the bank's power and renewable energy banking division, with insider trading on August 21, 2026, with regard to the bank's energy holding company client, South Jersey Industries.

==== AML/BSA compliance failure ====
In October 2026, Bank of America reported a $1.2 billion charge tied to a regulatory settlement after failing to report more than $5 billion in suspicious transactions to the U.S. government. As part of the settlement, the bank was required to work with an independent third party to find and report suspicious activity that had previously gone undetected.

=== Incidents ===
==== Wikileaks incident ====
In October 2009, Julian Assange of WikiLeaks claimed that his organization possessed a 5 gigabyte hard drive formerly used by a Bank of America executive and that Wikileaks intended to publish its contents. In November 2010, Forbes published an interview with Assange in which he stated his intent to publish information which would turn a major U.S. bank "inside out". In response to this announcement, Bank of America stock dropped 3.2%.

In December 2010, Bank of America announced that it would no longer service requests to transfer funds to WikiLeaks, stating that "Bank of America joins in the actions previously announced by MasterCard, PayPal, Visa Europe, and others and will not process transactions of any type that we have reason to believe are intended for WikiLeaks... This decision is based upon our reasonable belief that WikiLeaks may be engaged in activities that are, among other things, inconsistent with our internal policies for processing payments."

Later in December, it was announced that Bank of America purchased more than 300 Internet domain names in an attempt to preempt bad publicity that might be forthcoming in the anticipated WikiLeaks release. The domain names included as BrianMoynihanBlows.com, BrianMoynihanSucks.com and similar names for other top executives of the bank.

Sometime before August 2011, WikiLeaks claimed that 5 GB of Bank of America leaks was part of the deletion of over 3500 communications by Daniel Domscheit-Berg, a now ex-WikiLeaks volunteer.

==== Ryan Coogler incident ====
In March 2022, the bank was involved in an incident related to filmmaker Ryan Coogler, who was wrongly targeted as a bank robber and detained by the police in Atlanta, after Coogler tried to withdraw cash in the local branch of the Bank of America. After his identity was verified with both his California state ID card and his Bank of America card, Coogler was released and the bank released an apology statement. According to a number of sources, the bank's teller hadn't checked Coogler's ID to verify if he was the owner of the bank account before she asked the bank's supervisor to call police.

==== Employee fatalities ====
In 2013, an intern in the London office was found dead. It was reported that the intern had worked until 6am for the preceding three days before his death, and that this was typical of expectations at the bank. The incident sparked much debate regarding working hours at the firm, which resulted in rival firm Goldman Sachs capping intern hours to 17 per day.

In 2024, Leo Lukensas III a, former US Army Special Forces Veteran working in the investment banking division also died following heart problems. It was reported that the investment bank has a culture of working weeks in excess of 100 hours per week, and managers encouraging employees to under report their working hours to HR. Lukensas was reported to be seeking to leave the firm, citing excessive working hours. His manager, Gary Howe, was removed as a leader, although not fired from his post following the incident.

Erin Placenti, a Bank of America vice president, was stabbed to death in Times Square on August 31, 2026, along with another victim, who was hospitalized.

==== Debanking ====
Bank of America has been accused of terminating the accounts of people based on their religious or political views, often with alleged victims being aligned with conservative causes. In 2023, a Christian charity primarily focused on charitable work in Africa reportedly had its account suddenly terminated without explanation. The bank refused to explain anything until contacted by members of the media, where after refusing to explain anything to the customer, it proceeded to make a series of allegedly false accusations against the customer to a reporter. In response, a shareholder action proposal was made at a Bank of America annual meeting. In 2025, US President Donald Trump accused Bank of America CEO Brian Moynahan of political debanking, stating that he hoped the CEO would open his bank to conservatives.

==== Customer privacy ====
The bank faced heavy criticism and a congressional investigation following the events of January 6, 2021 at the US Capitol. The bank was accused of handing over extensive private profile information of any individual who may have shopped at Cabela's, rented a hotel anywhere in Virginia, or went to an ATM in DC on January 5–7, 2021, even though it had been under no compulsion to do so. The bank claimed in its defense only that it was allowed to do so.

== Competition ==
Bank of America's major competitors are Wells Fargo, Santander, PNC Financial Services, Ally Financial, Capital One, JPMorgan Chase Bank, US Bank, Citizens Financial Group, Citigroup, M&T Bank, and Truist.

== Buildings ==
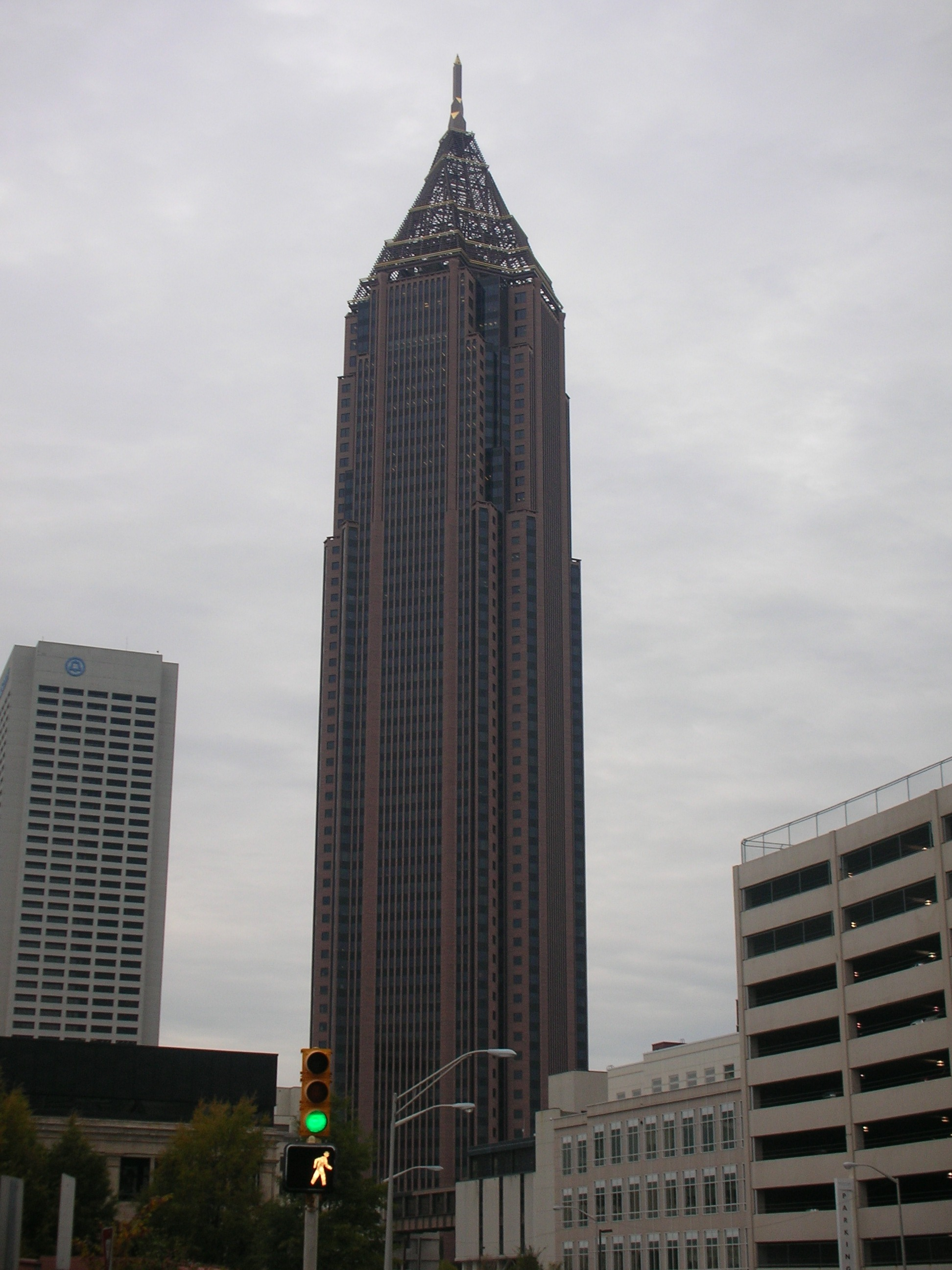
Bank of America Plaza in Atlanta, the tallest building in the Southern United States

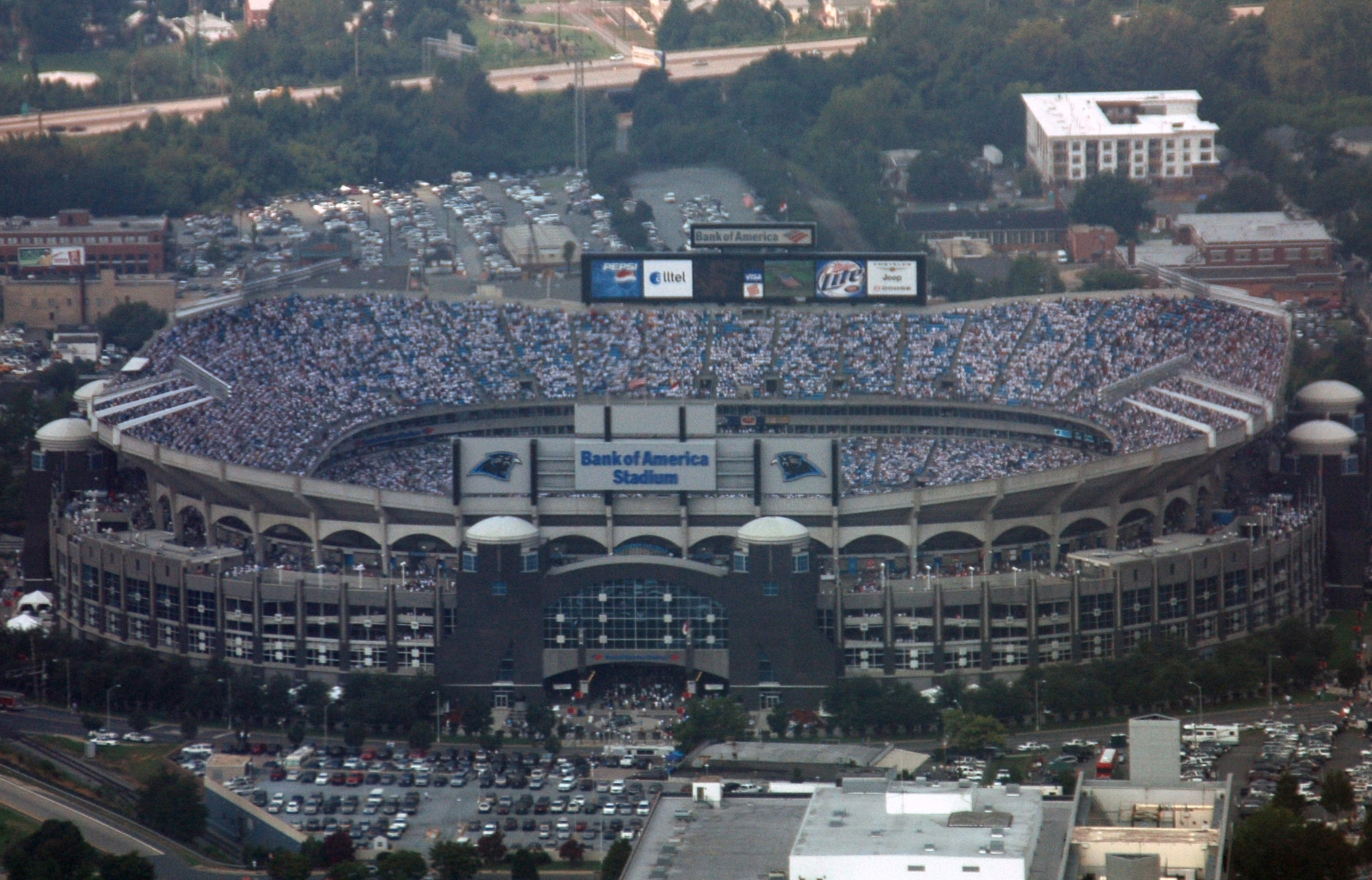
Bank of America Stadium, home to the Carolina Panthers of the National Football League

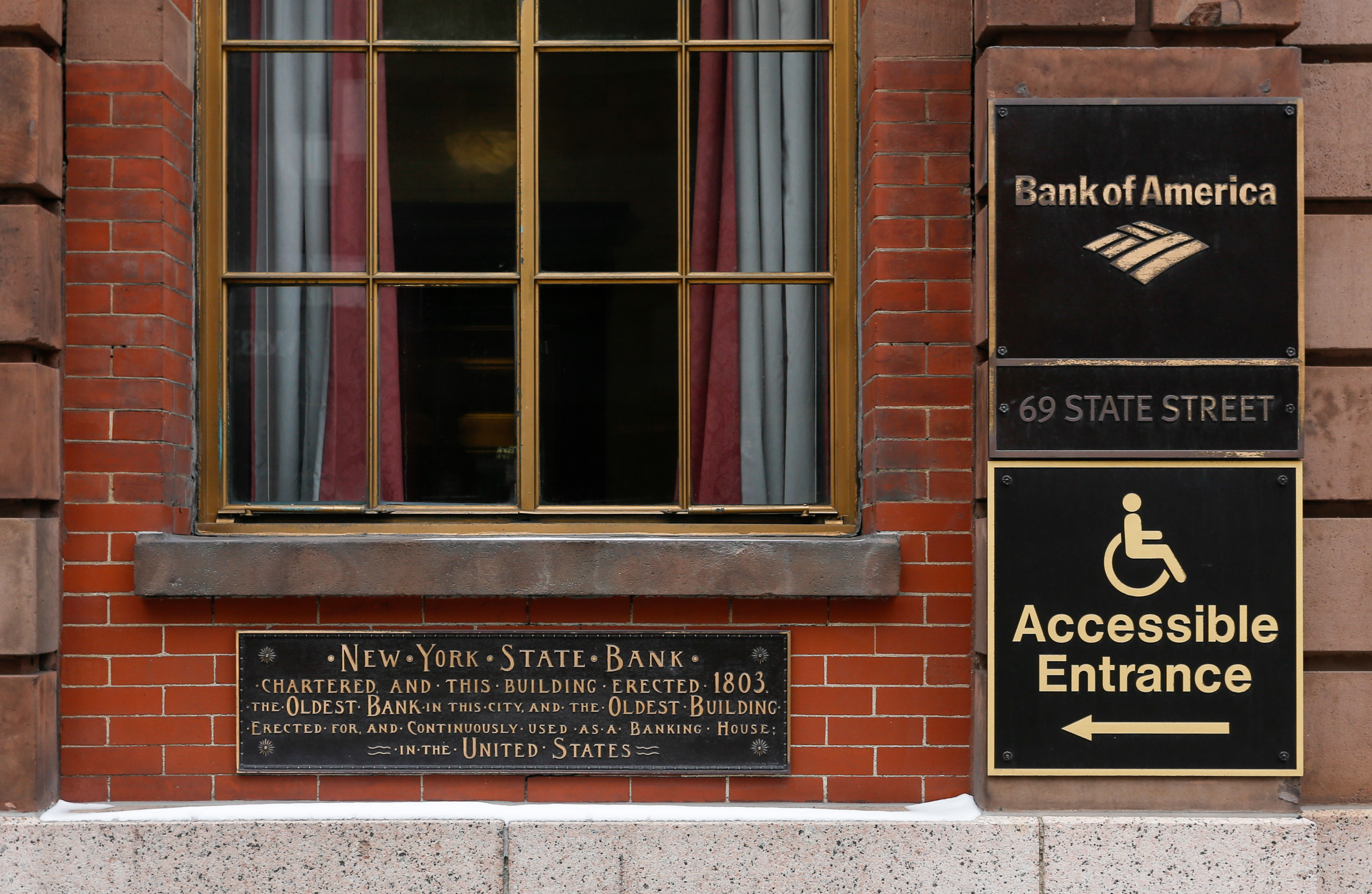
The 69 State Street branch in Albany, the oldest continually operating bank building in the United States

Buildings which Bank of America occupies include:

- Bank of America Tower in Phoenix, Arizona
- 9454 Wilshire Boulevard in Beverly Hills, California
- Bank of America Center in Los Angeles, California
- Transamerica Pyramid, in San Francisco, California
- 555 California Street, formerly the Bank of America Center and world headquarters, in San Francisco, California
- City Place I, also known as United Healthcare Center, in Hartford, Connecticut (the tallest building in Connecticut)
- Bank of America Plaza in Fort Lauderdale, Florida
- Bank of America Tower in Jacksonville, Florida
- Bank of America Financial Center (Brickell) and Bank of America Museum Tower (Downtown Miami) in Miami, Florida
- Bank of America Center in Orlando, Florida
- Bank of America Tower in St. Petersburg, Florida
- Bank of America Plaza in Tampa, Florida
- Bank of America Plaza in Atlanta, Georgia
- Bank of America Building, formerly the LaSalle Bank Building in Chicago, Illinois
- One City Center, often called the Bank of America building due to signage rights, in Portland, Maine
- Bank of America Building in Baltimore, Maryland
- Bank of America Plaza in St Louis, Missouri
- Bank of America Tower in Albuquerque, New Mexico
- Bank of America Tower in New York City, New York
- Bank of America Corporate Center in Charlotte, North Carolina (the corporate headquarters)
- Bank of America Plaza in Charlotte, North Carolina
- Bank of America Tower in Charlotte, North Carolina
- Hearst Tower in Charlotte, North Carolina
- Bank of America Plaza in Dallas, Texas
- Bank of America Tower in Midland, Texas
- Bank of America Plaza in San Antonio, Texas
- Bank of America Fifth Avenue Plaza in Seattle, Washington
- Columbia Center in Seattle, Washington
- 100 Federal Street in Boston, Massachusetts
- Bank of America Tower in Hong Kong

In 2010, the bank completed construction of 1 Bank of America Center in Charlotte center city. The tower, and accompanying hotel, is a LEED-certified building.

=== Former buildings ===
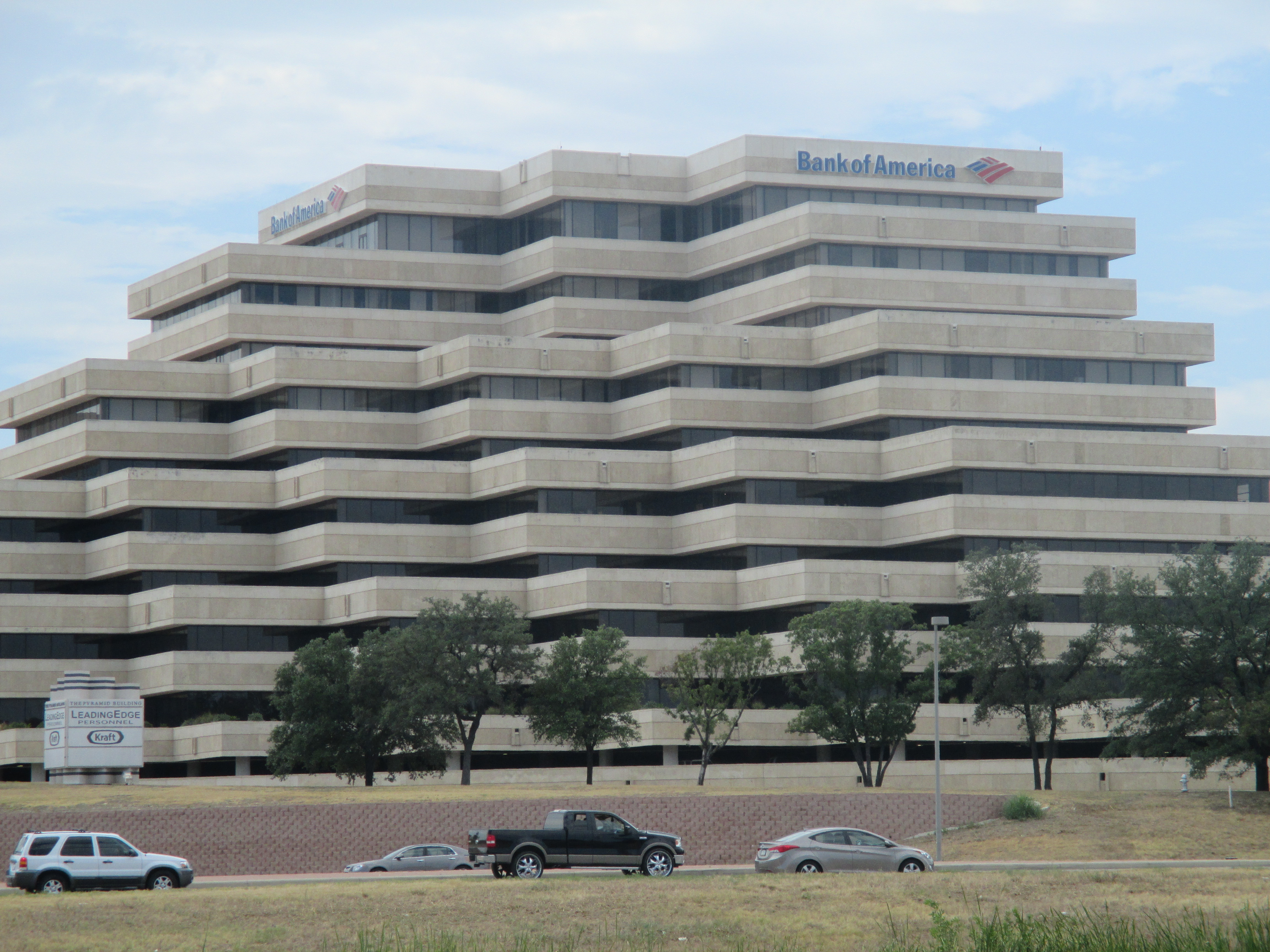
A pyramid-shaped former Bank of America branch building towers over Interstate 410 in San Antonio, Texas, in 2013.

The Robert B. Atwood Building in Anchorage, Alaska was at one time named the Bank of America Center; it was renamed in conjunction with the bank's acquisition of building tenant Security Pacific Bank. This particular branch was later acquired by Alaska-based Northrim Bank and moved across the street to the Linny Pacillo Parking Garage.

The Bank of America Building (Providence) opened in 1928 as the Industrial Trust Building and remains the tallest building in Rhode Island. Through a number of mergers, it was later known as the Industrial National Bank building and the Fleet Bank building. The building was leased by Bank of America from 2004 to 2012 and has been vacant since March 2013. The building is commonly known as the Superman Building based on a popular belief that it was the model for the Daily Planet building in the Superman comic books.

Miami Tower in Downtown Miami, known as Bank of America Tower for many years, was an iconic appearance in the television series Miami Vice. On April 18, 2012, the AIA's Florida Chapter placed the building on its list of "Florida Architecture 100 Years.100 Places" as Bank of America Tower.

TC Energy Center in Houston, Texas, was previously known as Bank of America Center until Bank of America ended its tenancy in the building in June 2019. Designed in the postmodern architecture style by renowned architect Philip Johnson, the building was completed in 1983.

== See also ==
- Bank of America (1904–1998)
- List of members ATM Industry Association (ATMIA)
- BAML Capital Partners
- Bank of America (Asia)
- Big Four banks
- Calibuso, et al. v. Bank of America Corp., et al.
- List of bank mergers in the United States
- List of largest banks in the United States
