= List of bank buildings =

This is a list of bank buildings that are notable. The architecture of banks in many countries is diverse, but has a common goal of conveying solidity and suggesting confidence in the security of deposits, as a matter of basic marketing. Numerous bank buildings are recognized as landmarks and/or included in historic registers. This list includes modern bank buildings as well as historic buildings that no longer serve as banks or that no longer exist.

== Argentina ==
=== Bank headquarters buildings ===
- Banco de Londres y América del Sur Headquarters, Buenos Aires
- Headquarters of the Bank of the Argentine Nation, Buenos Aires
- Headquarters of the Provincial Bank of Córdoba, Córdoba

== Australia ==
=== Bank headquarters buildings in Australia ===
- Commonwealth Trading Bank Building, Sydney, New South Wales
- State Savings Bank Building, Sydney, New South Wales
- Westpac Place, Sydney

== Canada ==
Building	Image	Dates	Location	City, Province	Description
Bank of Canada Building		1938 built 1979 expanded	234 Wellington Street; 45.420877°N 75.702807°W	Ottawa, Ontario	Head office of Bank of Canada. Late neoclassical-style, designed by Sumner Godfrey Davenport.

=== Bank headquarters buildings in Canada ===
- 800 Saint-Jacques Street West
- ATB Place
- Canadian Western Bank Place
- CIBC Square
- Commerce Court
- Complexe Desjardins
- Complexe Maisonneuve
- First Canadian Place
- HSBC Canada Building
- Royal Bank Plaza
- Scotia Plaza
- Toronto-Dominion Centre
- Tour de la Banque Nationale

=== Other bank buildings in Canada ===
- 500 Place D'Armes
- Bank of Canada Building
- Bank of Canada Building (Toronto)
- Bank of Commerce (Halifax, Nova Scotia)
- Bank of Commerce Building (Windsor, Ontario)
- Bankers Hall
- BDC Building
- Bell Media Tower
- CIBC 750 Lawrence
- CIBC Tower
- First Canadian Centre
- Place Ville Marie
- RBC WaterPark Place
- Royal Bank Tower (Vancouver)
- Royal Centre (Vancouver)
- Scotia Tower
- Scotia Tower (Montreal)
- TD Canada Trust Tower (Calgary)
- TD Tower (Edmonton)
- TD Centre (Halifax, Nova Scotia)
- TD Tower (Vancouver)
- Thomas D'Arcy McGee Building
- Tour de la Banque Nationale
- Two Bloor West

==== Historic bank buildings in Canada ====
- 197 Yonge Street
- 205 Yonge Street
- Bank of British North America Building
- Bank of Montreal Building (Toronto)
- Bank of Montreal Head Office
- Bank of Montreal National Historic Site
- Bank of Toronto (Yellowknife)
- Bank of Upper Canada Building
- Canada Permanent Trust Building
- Dominion Building
- Molson Bank Building
- Old Canadian Bank of Commerce Building
- One King West Hotel & Residence
- Quebec Bank Building, Montreal
- Rex Theatre (Whitewood)
- Royal Bank Building (Toronto)
- Royal Bank Tower (Montreal)
- Sir John A. Macdonald Building
- Trader's Bank Building
- Union Bank Building
- Domville Building

== China ==
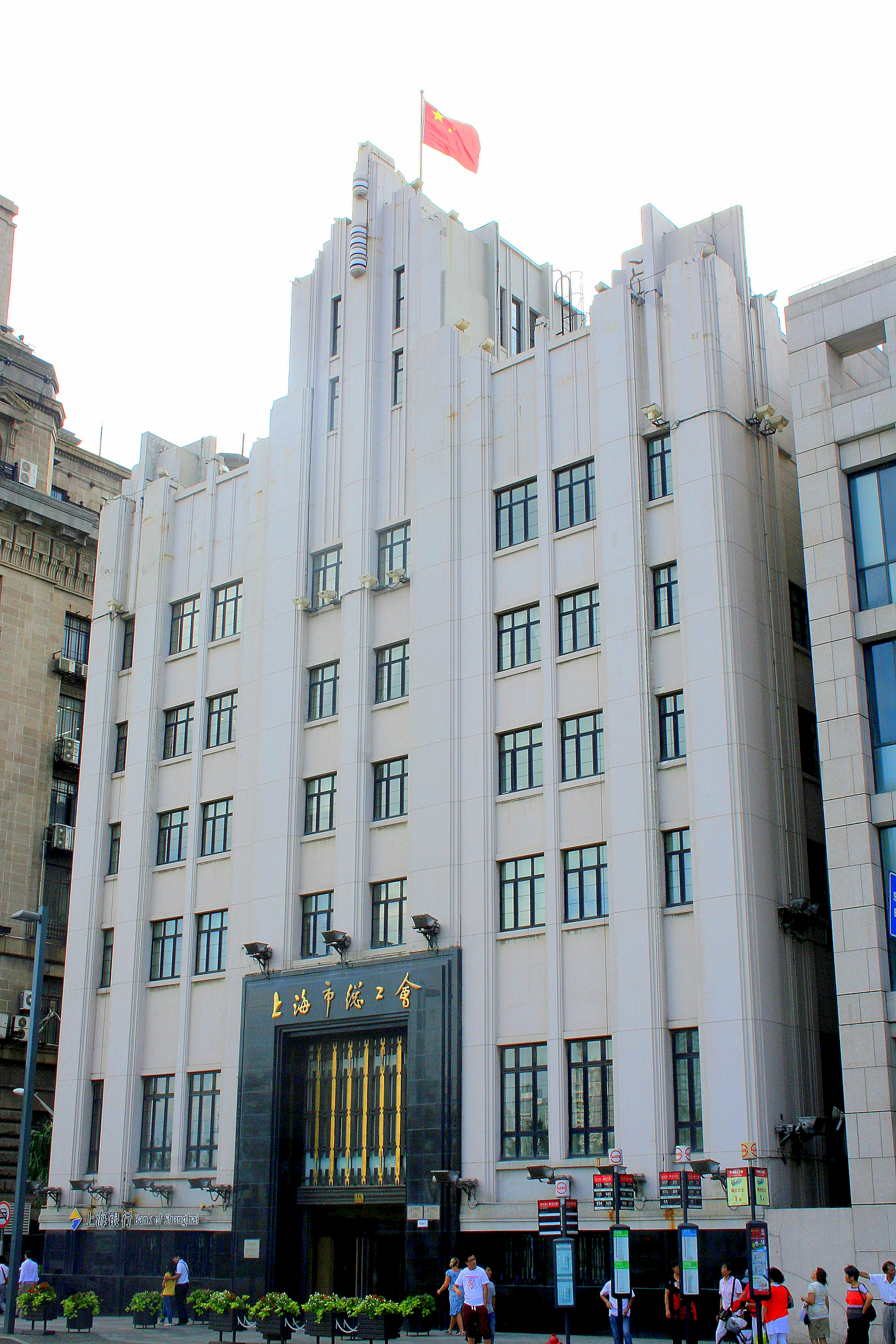
Bank of Communications Building

=== Bank headquarters buildings in China ===
- Bank of China Building, Shanghai, former headquarters of Bank of China
- Bank of Communications Building, Shanghai
- Bank of Shanghai Headquarters, Shanghai
- Bank of China Tower, Hong Kong, which is headquarters of Bank of China and was the tallest building in Asia when built
- Hang Seng Bank Headquarters Building, Hong Kong
- HSBC Building (Hong Kong), Hong Kong
- Standard Chartered Bank Building, Hong Kong

=== Other notable bank buildings in China ===
Building	Image	Dates	Location	City, Province	Description
Minsheng Bank Building		2001-08 built	30.597°N 114.268°E	Wuhan, Hubei	331.0 m (1,086.0 ft)
China Merchants Bank Building		1907 built	the Bund; 31.2367°N 121.4861°E	Shanghai	

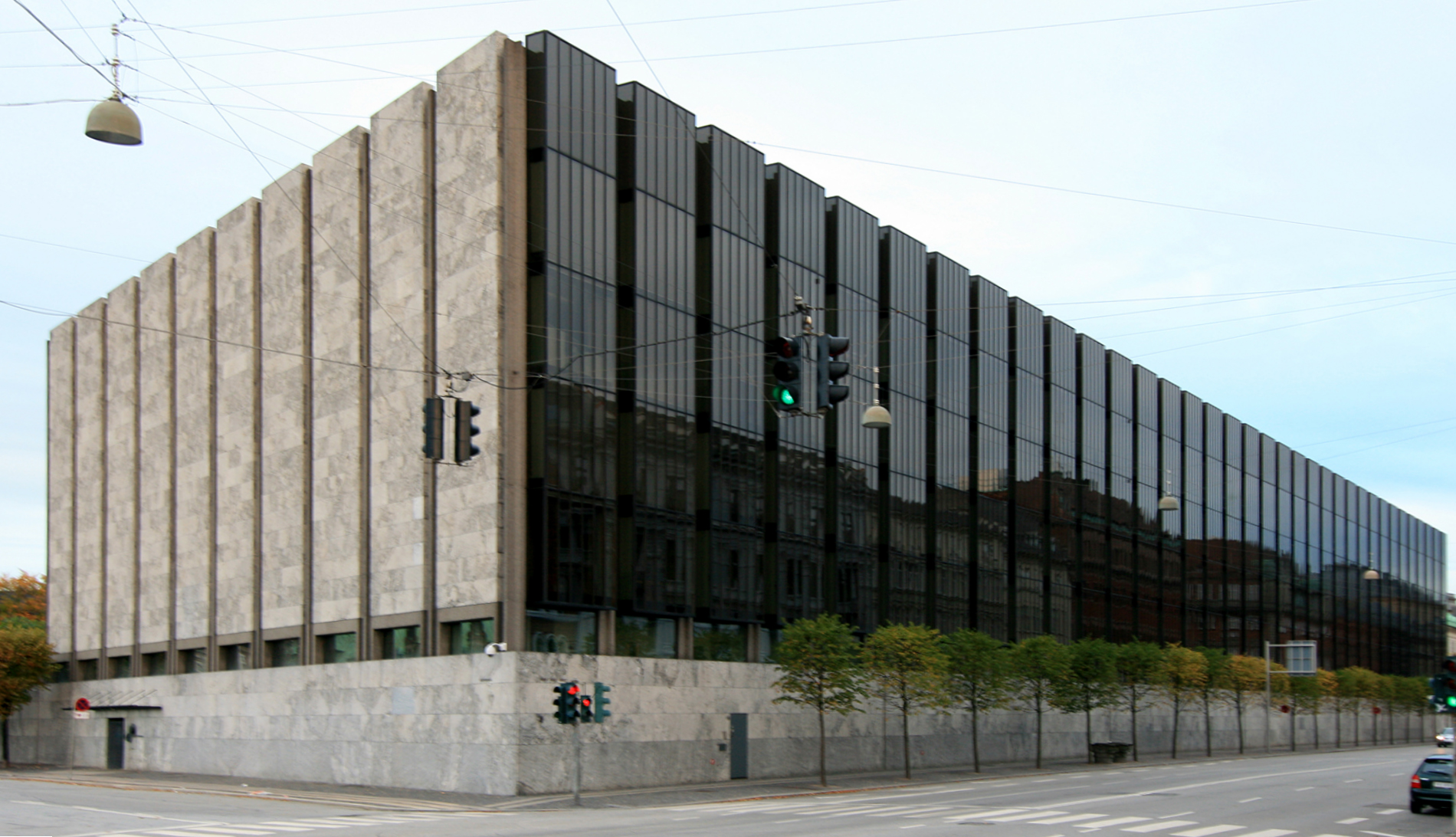
Danmarks Nationalbank

== Denmark ==
- Axelborg, Copenhagen
- Danmarks Nationalbank, Copenhagen
- Sparekassen Bikuben, Copenhagen
- Sparekassen for Kjøbenhavn og Omegn, Copenhagen
- Business- and Agricultural Bank of Jutland
- Danmarks Nationalbank
- Sparekassen Bikuben
- Sparekassen for Store Heddinge og omegn

== France ==
=== Bank headquarters buildings in France ===
- Crédit Lyonnais headquarters, Paris

== Germany ==
=== Bank headquarters buildings in Germany ===
- Deutsche Bank Twin Towers

== Malta ==
=== Bank headquarters buildings in Malta ===
- Spinola Palace, Valletta

== Philippines ==
=== Bank headquarters buildings in the Philippines ===
- Exportbank Plaza
- PBCom Tower
- RCBC Plaza
- UnionBank Plaza

== Puerto Rico ==
	Building	Image	Dates	Location	Municipality	Description
1	Banco Crédito y Ahorro Ponceño		1924 built 1987 NRHP	Plaza Degetau; 18.011314°N 66.613333°W	Ponce	Beaux-Arts building designed by Francisco Porrata-Doria
2	Banco de Ponce		1924 built 1987 NRHP	Amor and Comercio Sts., Plaza Degetau; 18°00′40″N 66°36′48″W	Ponce	Beaux-Arts building designed by architect Francisco Porrata Doria

== United Kingdom ==
=== Bank headquarters buildings in the United Kingdom ===
- Northern Bank Headquarters, Belfast, Northern Ireland

== United States ==
=== Bank headquarters buildings in the U.S. ===
- 25 Park Place
- 200 West Street
- 388 Greenwich Street
- 611 Place
- 1600 Broadway
- Albuquerque Plaza
- BNY Mellon Center (Philadelphia)
- BNY Mellon Center (Pittsburgh)
- BOK Tower
- Capital One Tower (Virginia)
- City National Plaza
- Compass Bank Building (Albuquerque)
- Farmers and Mechanics Bank (Georgetown)
- Fidelity National Bank and Trust Company Building, The
- First City Tower
- First Interstate Center
- First National Bank Building (Pittsburgh)
- First National Bank Tower
- Huntington Tower
- Frost Bank Tower
- Hill Building
- Investors Bank
- Mercantile National Bank Building
- Norwest Center (Minneapolis)
- Regions Tower (Indianapolis)
- One PNC Plaza
- One Wells Fargo Center
- Fourth and Vine Tower
- PNC Plaza (Raleigh)
- RBC Plaza (Minneapolis)
- State of Georgia Building
- SunTrust Plaza
- Edward A. Thomas Building
- Tower at PNC Plaza
- U.S. Bancorp Tower
- U.S. Bancorp Center
- Winston Tower

=== Others by state, territory and insular area ===
KEY

Individually NRHP-listed
Contributing in NRHP-listed historic district
Other

==== Alabama ====
	Building	Image	Dates	Location	City, State	Description
1	City National Bank / First Alabama Bank		1922 built 1985 NRHP	2301 University Blvd. 33°12′36″N 87°34′01″W	Tuscaloosa	Classical Revival
2	Henderson National Bank		1948 built 1980 NRHP	118 S. Jefferson St. 34°43′50″N 86°35′10″W	Huntsville	Ashlar and green stone Moderne-style building.

- Bank of Andalusia
- Bank of Ensley
- Bank of Fairhope
- City National Bank (Tuscaloosa, Alabama)
- First National Bank (Huntsville, Alabama)
- First National Bank (Mobile, Alabama)
- First National Bank Building (Andalusia, Alabama)
- Old State Bank (Decatur, Alabama)
- Concord Center
- Regions Bank Building (Mobile)
- Regions Center (Birmingham)
- Regions-Harbert Plaza
- RSA Trustmark Building
- Shipt Tower
- Waterman–Smith Building

==== Arizona ====
- Bank of America Tower (Phoenix)
- U.S. Bank Center (Phoenix)
- Valley National Bank Building (Tucson, Arizona)
- Wells Fargo Plaza (Phoenix)
- Gila Valley Bank and Trust Building
- Valley National Bank (Casa Grande, Arizona)
- Valley National Bank Building (Tucson, Arizona)

==== Arkansas ====
- Simmons Tower, a modern building
- Arkansas Bank & Trust Company
- Bank of Booneville Building
- Bank of Carthage (Arkansas)
- Bank of Clarendon
- Bank of Commerce (El Dorado, Arkansas)
- Bank of Gentry
- Bank of Kingston
- Bank of Malvern
- Bank of Marshall Building
- Bank of Osceola
- Bank of Rogers Building
- Bank of Searcy
- Crittenden County Bank and Trust Company
- Dermott Bank & Trust Company Building
- El Paso Bank
- Exchange Bank (El Dorado, Arkansas)
- Exchange Bank Building (Little Rock, Arkansas)
- Farmer's State Bank
- Farmers and Merchants Bank (Mountain View, Arkansas)
- Farmers and Merchants Bank-Masonic Lodge
- Farmers Bank Building (Leslie, Arkansas)
- Farmers State Bank (Conway, Arkansas)
- First National Bank (Siloam Springs, Arkansas)
- First National Bank Building (Monette, Arkansas)
- First National Bank of Morrilton
- German-American Bank
- Hiwasse Bank Building
- Mercantile Bank Building (Jonesboro, Arkansas)
- Merchants & Farmers Bank
- Merchants and Planters Bank (Clarendon, Arkansas)
- Merchants and Planters Bank Building
- Monroe County Bank Building
- National Bank of Commerce Building (Paragould, Arkansas)
- Old Bank of Amity
- Peoples Bank and Loan Building
- Peoples Building & Loan Building
- Planters Bank Building (Osceola, Arkansas)
- Pottsville Citizen's Bank
- Worthen Bank Building

==== California ====
- Bank of America Plaza (Los Angeles)
- Bank of California Building (Los Angeles, California)
- Bank of Lucas, Turner & Co.
- Bank of the West Tower (Sacramento)
- Columbia Savings Bank Building
- Farmers and Merchants Bank of Los Angeles
- Federal Reserve Bank of San Francisco, Los Angeles Branch
- Hellman Building
- Hibernia Bank Building (San Francisco)
- International Savings & Exchange Bank Building
- Old Federal Reserve Bank Building (San Francisco)
- One Sansome Street
- Sanwa Bank Plaza
- U.S. Bank Tower (Los Angeles)
- Union Bank Plaza
- Wells Fargo Center (Los Angeles)
- Bank of Italy (Fresno, California)
- Bank of Italy (Paso Robles, California)
- Bank of Italy (Visalia, California)
- Bank of Italy Building (San Francisco)
- Bank of Italy, Merced
- Bank of Los Banos Building
- Bank of Pinole
- Calaveras County Bank
- Coachella Valley Savings No. 2
- Federal Reserve Bank of San Francisco
- Old Bank of America Building (Red Bluff, California)
- Ontario State Bank Block
- Santa Fe Federal Savings and Loan Association
- Security Building (Los Angeles)
- Security Trust and Savings

==== Colorado ====
- FirstBank Building
- U.S. Bank Tower (Denver)
- American National Bank Building (Alamosa, Colorado)
- Bank Lofts
- Citizens National Bank Building (Glenwood Springs, Colorado)
- First National Bank Building (Craig, Colorado)
- First National Bank Building (Steamboat Springs, Colorado)
- First National Bank of Haxtun
- Wheeler Bank
- Farmers State Bank Building (1930), Fort Morgan, NRHP-listed in Morgan County
- Delta County Bank Building, Delta, NRHP-listed in Delta County

==== Delaware ====
- Bank of Newark Building
- First National Bank of Seaford
- Newport National Bank
- Sussex National Bank of Seaford
- Wilmington Savings Fund Society Building
- Wilmington Trust Company Bank

==== Illinois ====
- Pioneer Trust and Savings Bank Building

== Zimbabwe ==
=== Bank headquarters buildings in Zimbabwe ===
- New Reserve Bank Tower
