= Nazzareno Orlandi =

Italian-Argentine painter

Nazzareno Orlandi (May 29, 1861 – 1952) was an Italian-Argentine painter.

== Early Years in Italy ==
He was born in Ascoli Piceno, Italy. He studied design in Ascoli Piceno and then in the Academy of Fine Arts in Florence, where he won many awards. Serving in the army for three years, he focused on military paintings and battle scenes.

In 1887 at Venice, he displayed Pro patria; Ozio in quartiere; Mi ama, non mi ama?; Sana; and Pensieri profani. Among other works are Avamposti; Scuola; In chiesa; Studi; Cucina militare; Prigione semplice; Porta Capitrcina; Ricordi dell' Adriatico; San Vittore; Marina; L'uscita dei coscriti; Passeggiata; Esplorazioni; and Ricordi d'Ascoli. He was also an art critic.

== Later life in Argentina ==
In 1889, Orlandi traveled to Buenos Aires to complete some commissions for the national government. In 1893, he was awarded a gold medal at the International Exposition held in Chicago, Illinois. In 1897, he participated at the Venice Biennale. In 1910, the Academy of Fine Arts of Florence admitted him as an honorary academic. In 1927, he won first prize at the Communal Exposition of Applied and Industrial Arts of Buenos Aires, organized by the Municipal Commission of Fiestas Populares.

In Buenos Aires, he painted in the Ateneo Gran Splendid, the Normal School Mariano Acosta, and the gilded Salon of the Casa de Cultura, that once belonged to the newspaper La Prensa. In 1890, he helped decorate with frescoes the Church of the Savior, located on Tucumán y Callao streets in Buenos Aires. In 1903 painted the cupula of the Church of San Telmo, the Theater La Comedia, the Círculo Militar, the former Palacio Paz, and the Círculo Italiano. In 1904 he helped decorate the Municipal Theater of Santa Fe. Alongside Emilio Caraffa and Carlos Camilloni he prepared the designs for the decoration of the Cathedral of Córdoba, Argentina. He also helped, along with the artists Francesco Tamburini and Gonzaga Coni with the decorative designs for the Teatro Rivera Indarte. He also worked on the old Stock Exchange, located on San Lorenzo street, no longer extant; and some of the stage decorations at the Colón Theater (Opera House), working along with Domingo Fontana. Orlandi died in 1952, in Buenos Aires.
