= American National Bank Building =

American National Bank Building may refer to one of the following historic structures:

== In the United States ==
- American National Bank Building (Alamosa, Colorado)
- American National Bank Building (Pensacola, Florida)
- American National Bank Building (Sarasota, Florida)
- American National Bank Building (West Palm Beach, Florida)
- American National Bank (Camden, New Jersey), listed on the NRHP in New Jersey
- Federal-American National Bank (Washington, D.C.), listed on the NRHP in Washington, D.C.
