= Old Customshouse (Wilmington, Delaware) =

- U.S. National Register of Historic Places
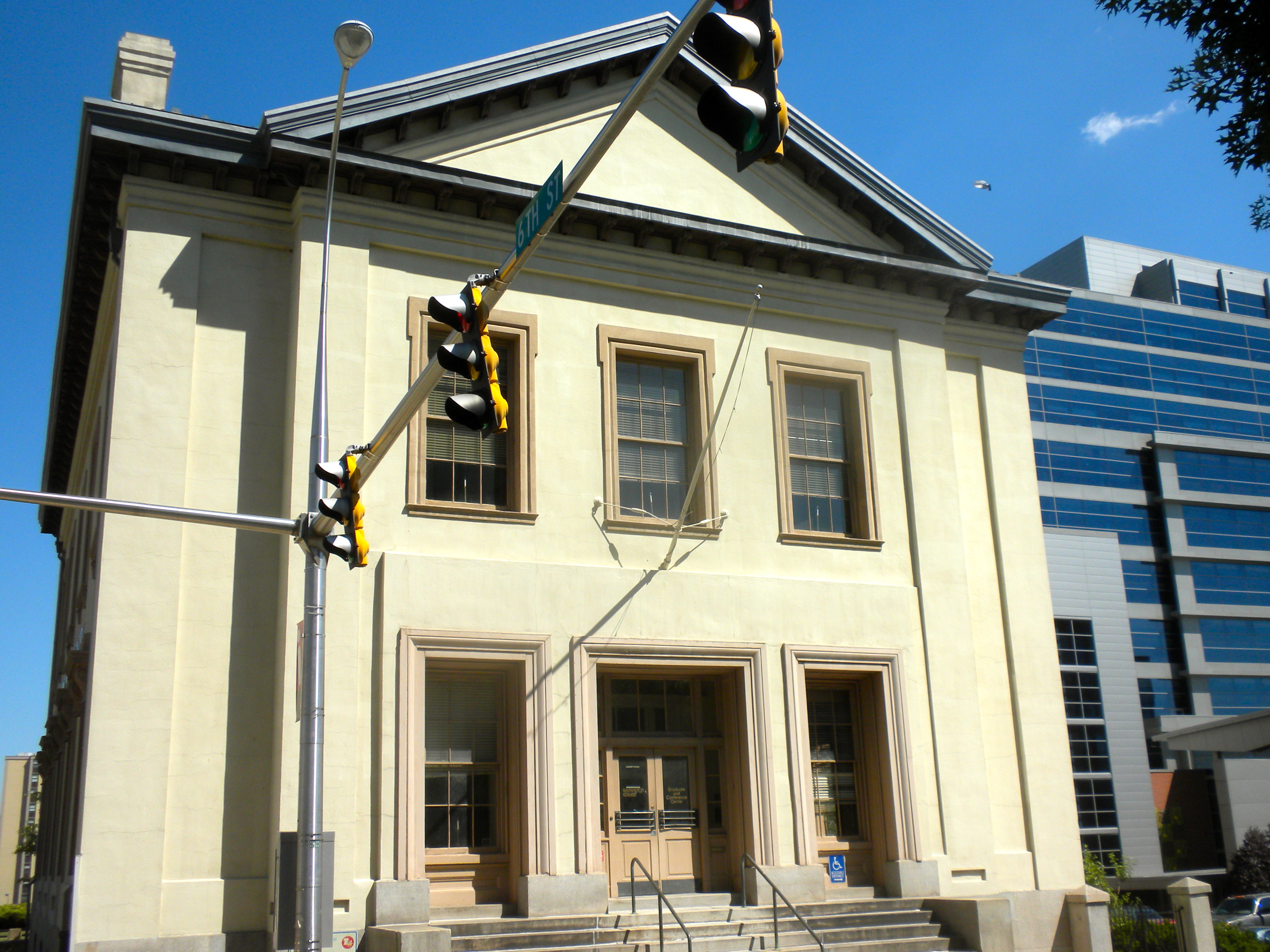
- Old Customshouse in front of the new Courthouse

- Location within Delaware Location within the United States
- Location: 516 N. King St., Wilmington, Delaware
- Coordinates: 39.741318°N 75.549180°W
- Area: 0.43 acres
- Built: 1855
- Architect: Ammi B. Young
- Architectural style: Greek Revival
- NRHP reference No.: 74000604
- Added to NRHP: 1974-11-21

The Old Customshouse is a historic government building at 516 North King Street in Wilmington, Delaware. It was built in 1855 and added to the National Register of Historic Places in 1974.

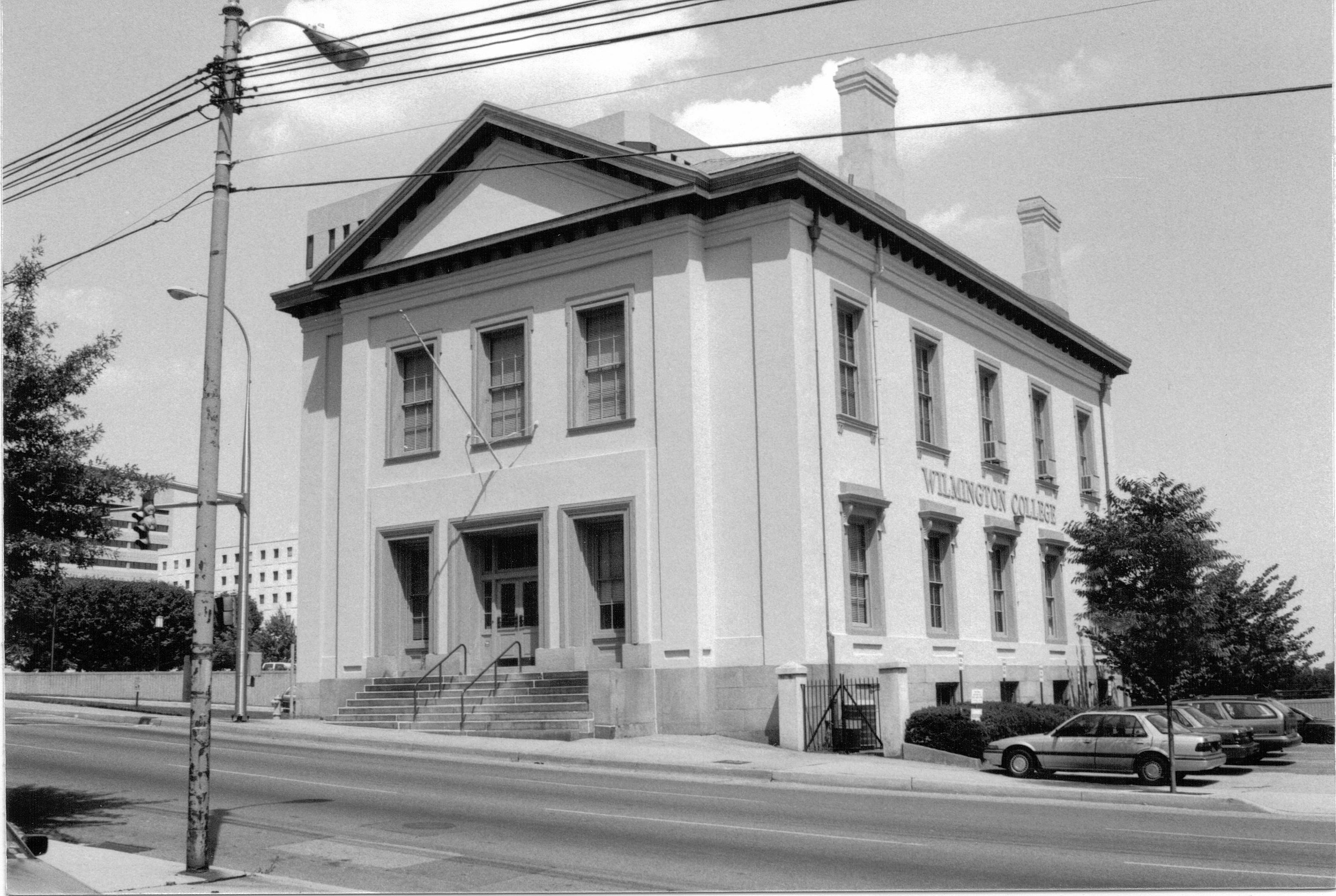
U. S. Customhouse, Wilmington, DE 518 N. King Street, Wilmington, Delaware 1991

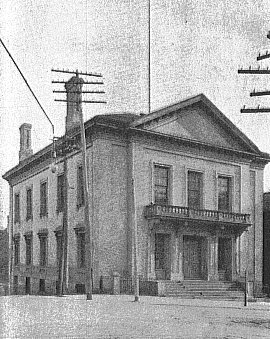
U. S. Customhouse, Wilmington, 518 King Street, Wilmington, DE 1901

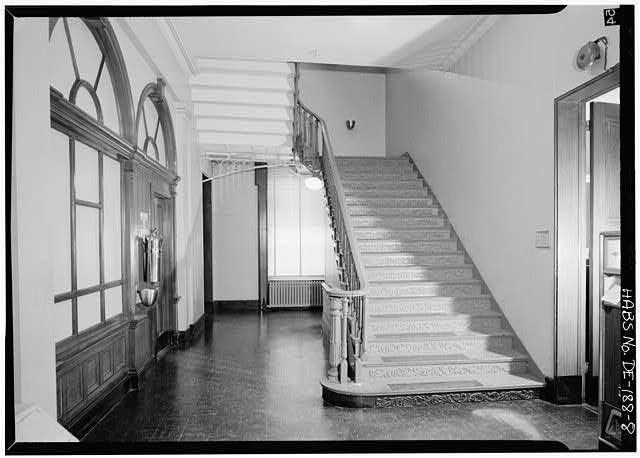
Old Customs House, King at Sixth Street, Wilmington, New Castle County, DE

== History ==
Originally, Delaware's custom house existed in New Castle, but it was moved to a small rented building on Water Street in Wilmington around 1800. In 1837, the First Board of Trade came into existence to promote trade through the port of Wilmington. As one of their first actions, the organization sent a petition to Congress asking for a permanent custom house.

Representative George R. Riddle secured appropriations for what was intended to be a dedicated customs house in 1852 which was completed in 1855. Despite the intent for a single-use facility, the Federal Court and the Post Office also shared the building until 1897.

During the Korean and Vietnam war periods, the Old Customshouse served as the Delaware initial reporting and induction site for drafted soldiers. The Wilmington Parking Authority built the Customs House Garage, a 1,335 car facility adjacent to the building.

Wilmington University purchased the building from the federal government in 1983 and used it for both business meetings and downtown classes. In 2008, Wilmington University sold the building to a group of investors who then created Old Customs House LLC. In 2018, the building was then sold to the State of Delaware, who plans to turn the space into offices for the judicial branch and community court facilities.

== Architecture ==
Ammi B. Young designed the Greek Revival building. The two-story structure consist of a cut stone base with stucco exterior walls and four smokestacks. It used to have a portico with a triangular pediment but that was removed in 1929. The hip roof is made of iron using innovative foundry technology for the period.

== See also ==
- U.S. Post Office, Courthouse, and Customhouse (Wilmington, Delaware)
- List of United States federal courthouses in Delaware
- National Register of Historic Places listings in Wilmington, Delaware
