= Wilmington Trust Company Bank =

- U.S. National Register of Historic Places
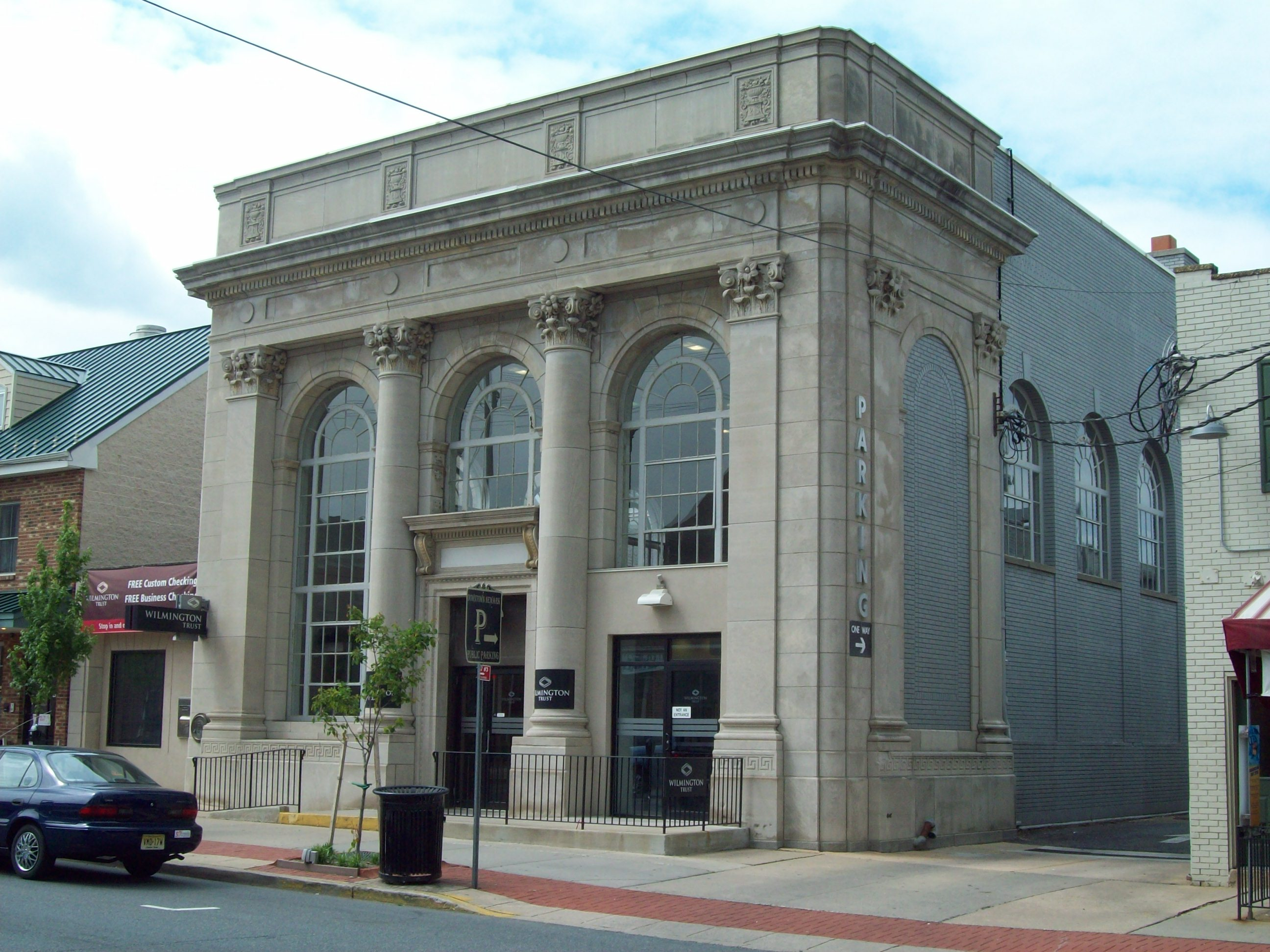
- Wilmington Trust Company Bank, April 2010

- Location within Delaware Location within the United States
- Location: 82 E. Main St., Newark, Delaware
- Coordinates: 39.683479°N 75.750114°W
- Area: 0.5 acres (0.20 ha)
- Built: 1923
- Architectural style: Classical Revival
- MPS: Newark MRA
- NRHP reference No.: 82002351
- Added to NRHP: May 7, 1982

Wilmington Trust Company Bank is a historic bank building in Newark in New Castle County, Delaware. It was built about 1926 and is a one-story, rectangular plan brick structure with a cast concrete / cement Neoclassical facade. It was built by the Farmer's Trust Company of Newark, which was acquired in 1952 by the Wilmington Trust Company. It is owned today by M&T Bank, which bought Wilmington Trust in 2008.

It was added to the National Register of Historic Places in 1982.

== See also ==
- List of bank buildings
- Wilmington Trust Headquarters
- National Register of Historic Places listings in Newark, Delaware
