= List of United States federal courthouses in Delaware =

Following is a list of current and former courthouses of the United States federal court system located in Delaware. Each entry indicates the name of the building along with an image, if available, its location and the jurisdiction it covers, the dates during which it was used for each such jurisdiction, and, if applicable the person for whom it was named, and the date of renaming. Dates of use will not necessarily correspond with the dates of construction or demolition of a building, as pre-existing structures may be adapted for court use, and former court buildings may later be put to other uses. Also, the official name of the building may be changed at some point after its use as a federal court building has been initiated.

== Courthouses ==
Courthouse	City	Image	Street address	Jurisdiction	First used	Last used	Notes
Old Court House†	New Castle		211 Delaware Street	D. Del.	1789	1855	Now in use as a museum, mayoral office, and shops.
Old Customshouse†	Wilmington		516 North King Street	D. Del.	1856	1897	Now used by Wilmington University.
U.S. Post Office and Courthouse	Wilmington		Ninth St. between Shipley & Orange Sts.	D. Del.	1897	1937	Sold in 1940.
U.S. Post Office, Court House, and Custom House†	Wilmington		1100 North Market Street	D. Del.	1937	1973	Now privately owned.
J. Caleb Boggs Federal Building	Wilmington		844 King Street	D. Del.	?	present	Named after U.S. Senator J. Caleb Boggs.

== Key ==
^{†}	Listed on the National Register of Historic Places (NRHP)
^{††}	NRHP-listed and also designated as a National Historic Landmark
