= United States Post Office, Courthouse, and Customhouse (Wilmington, Delaware) =

- U.S. Post Office, Courthouse, and Customhouse
- U.S. National Register of Historic Places
- U.S. Historic district – Contributing property
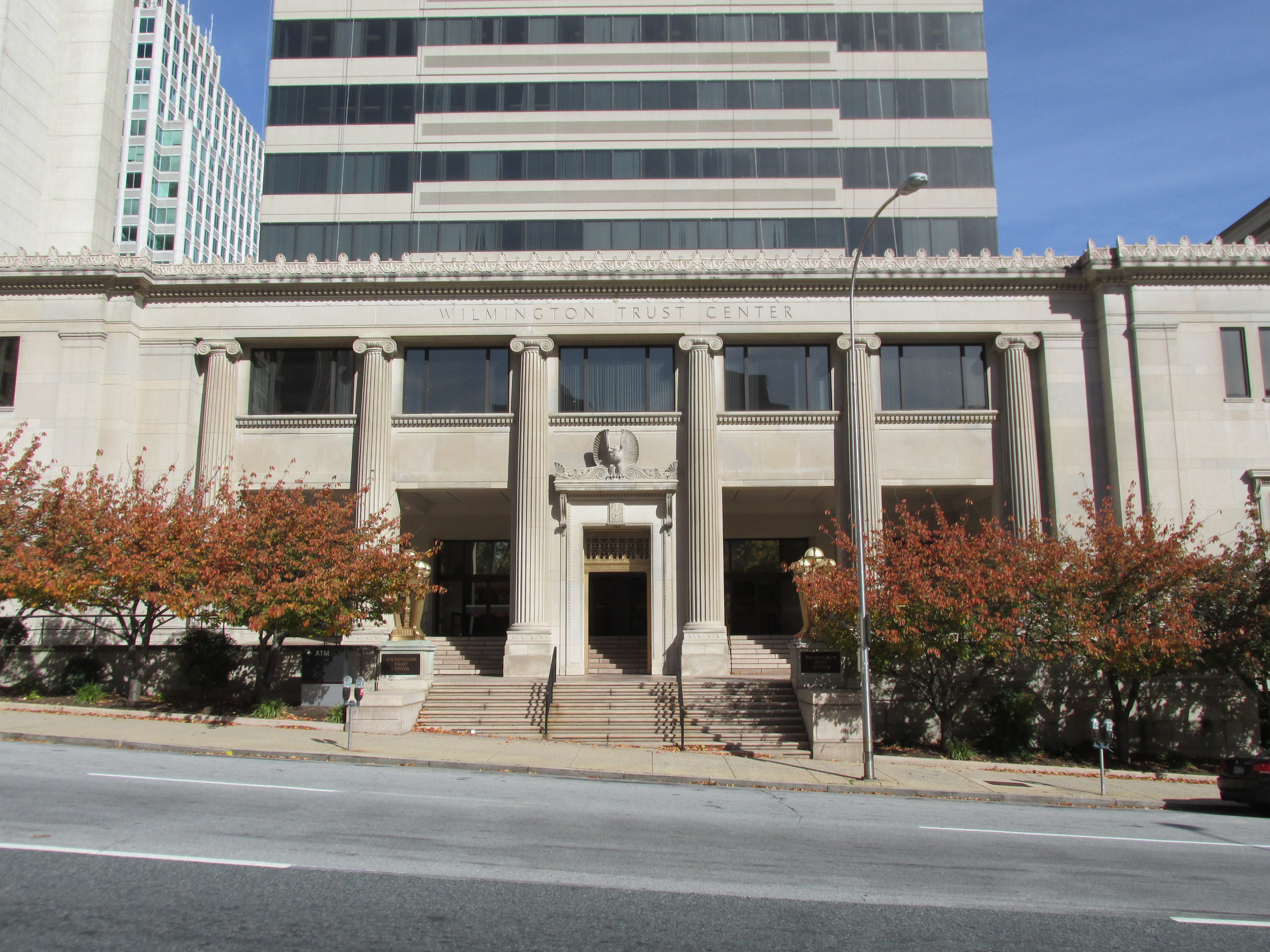
- Former Post Office, Courthouse and Customhouse

- Location within Delaware Location within the United States
- Interactive map showing the location of the U.S. Post Office, Courthouse, and Customhouse, Wilmington
- Location: 11th and Market Sts., Wilmington, Delaware
- Coordinates: 39°44′48″N 75°32′48″W
- Area: 1.3 acres (0.53 ha)
- Built: 1933-35, 1937
- Built by: Irwin & Leighton
- Architect: Associated Federal Architects
- Architectural style: Classical Revival
- Part of: Rodney Square Historic District (ID11000522)
- NRHP reference No.: 79000638

Significant dates
- Added to NRHP: June 14, 1979
- Designated CP: March 24, 2017

The U.S. Post Office, Courthouse, and Customhouse, also known as Main Post Office and the Wilmington Trust Headquarters, is a historic post office, courthouse, and custom house, located on Rodney Square in Wilmington, New Castle County, Delaware. It was added to the National Register of Historic Places in 1979.

== History ==
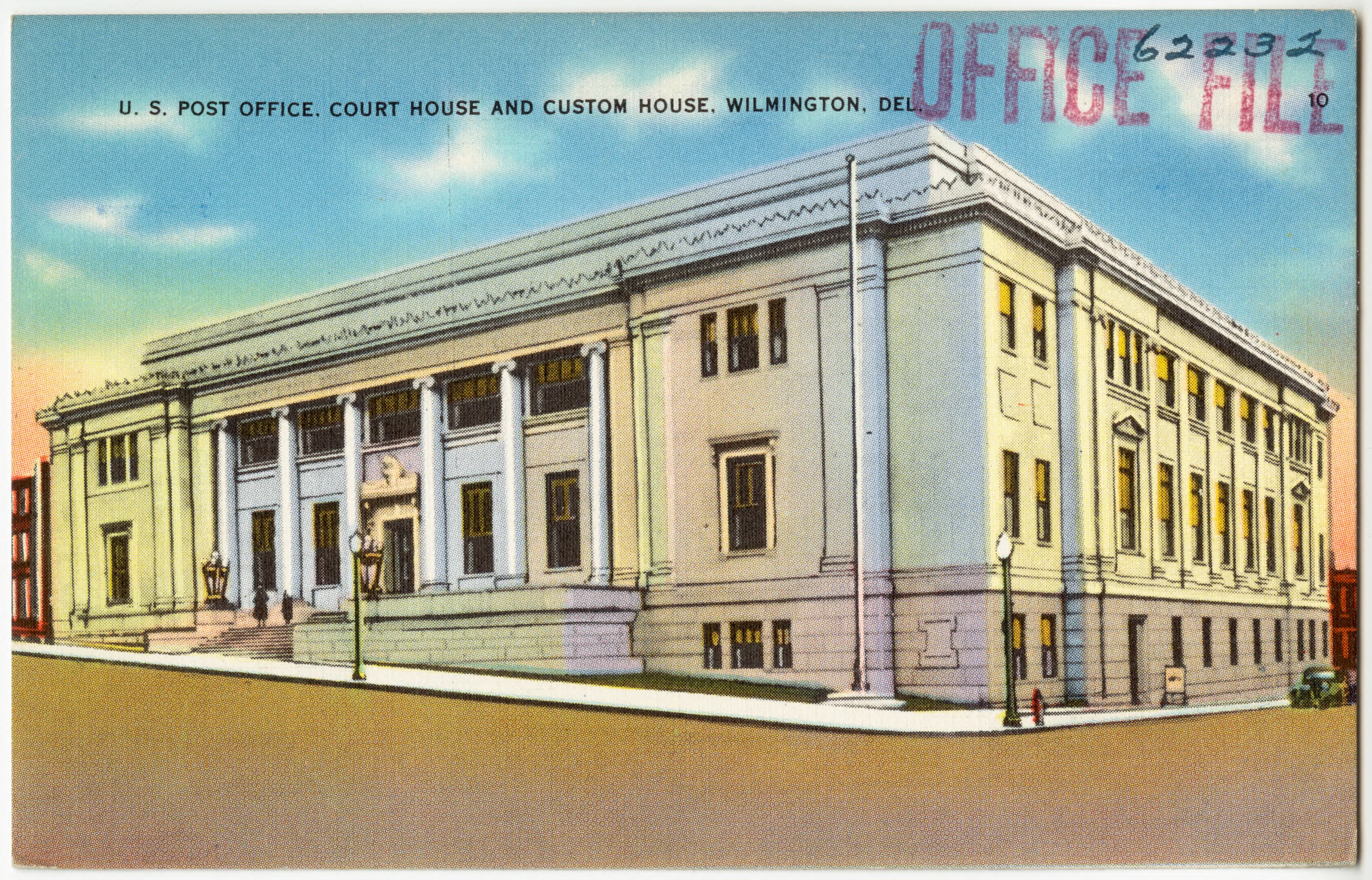
Postcard showing building, c. 1930-45

The U.S. Post Office, Courthouse, and Customhouse was designed by the Associated Federal Architects in 1933–1935 and built by Irwin & Leighton. The building was completed in 1937 on 11th and Market Streets on Rodney Square in Wilmington, New Castle County, Delaware. In addition to historically being a post office, courthouse, and custom house, it is currently the headquarters of Wilmington Trust.

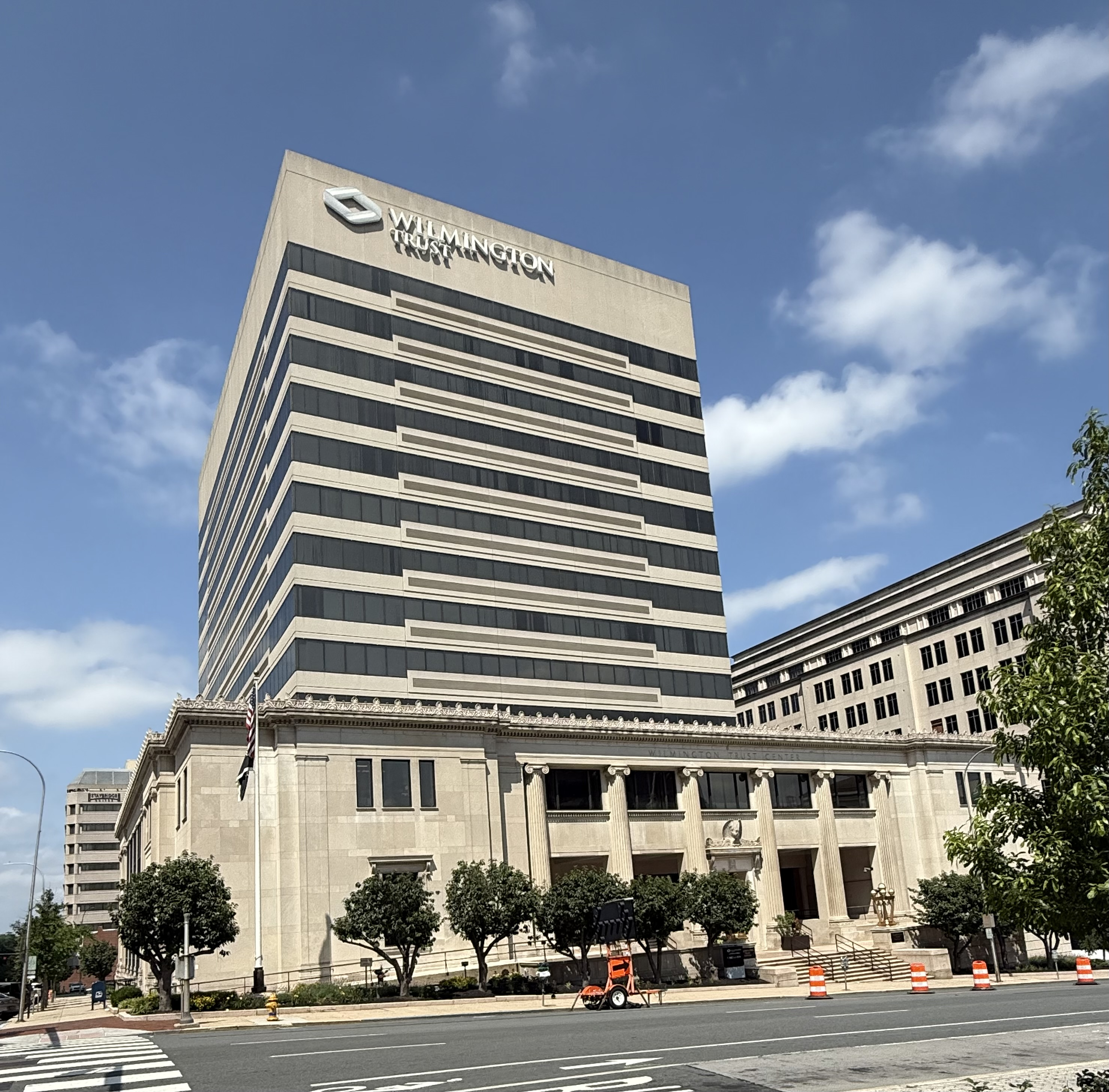
Wilmington Trust Building

It was listed on the National Register of Historic Places on June 14, 1979. It is also designated as a contributing property of the Rodney Square Historic District on March 24, 2017.

== Architecture ==
The U.S. Post Office, Courthouse, and Customhouse is in Classical Revival style. It is a three-story, cut stone structure with six large stone pillars across the main entrance. the gross building area is 104,669 sq. ft.

Its interior lobby features Art Moderne style with marble columns, marble floors, and two murals. The courtroom is also in Art Modern style in chandeliers, judge's bench, lawyers' tables, and jury box. There is also a Works Progress Administration (WPA) painting behind the judge's box. There are three WPA painting in the post office.

A vertical modern addition now emerges from the historic facade.

== See also ==
- Old Customshouse (Wilmington, Delaware)
- Wilmington Trust Newark Branch
- List of United States federal courthouses in Delaware
- List of United States post offices
- National Register of Historic Places listings in Wilmington, Delaware
