= Pioneer Trust and Savings Bank Building =

Abandoned building in Chicago

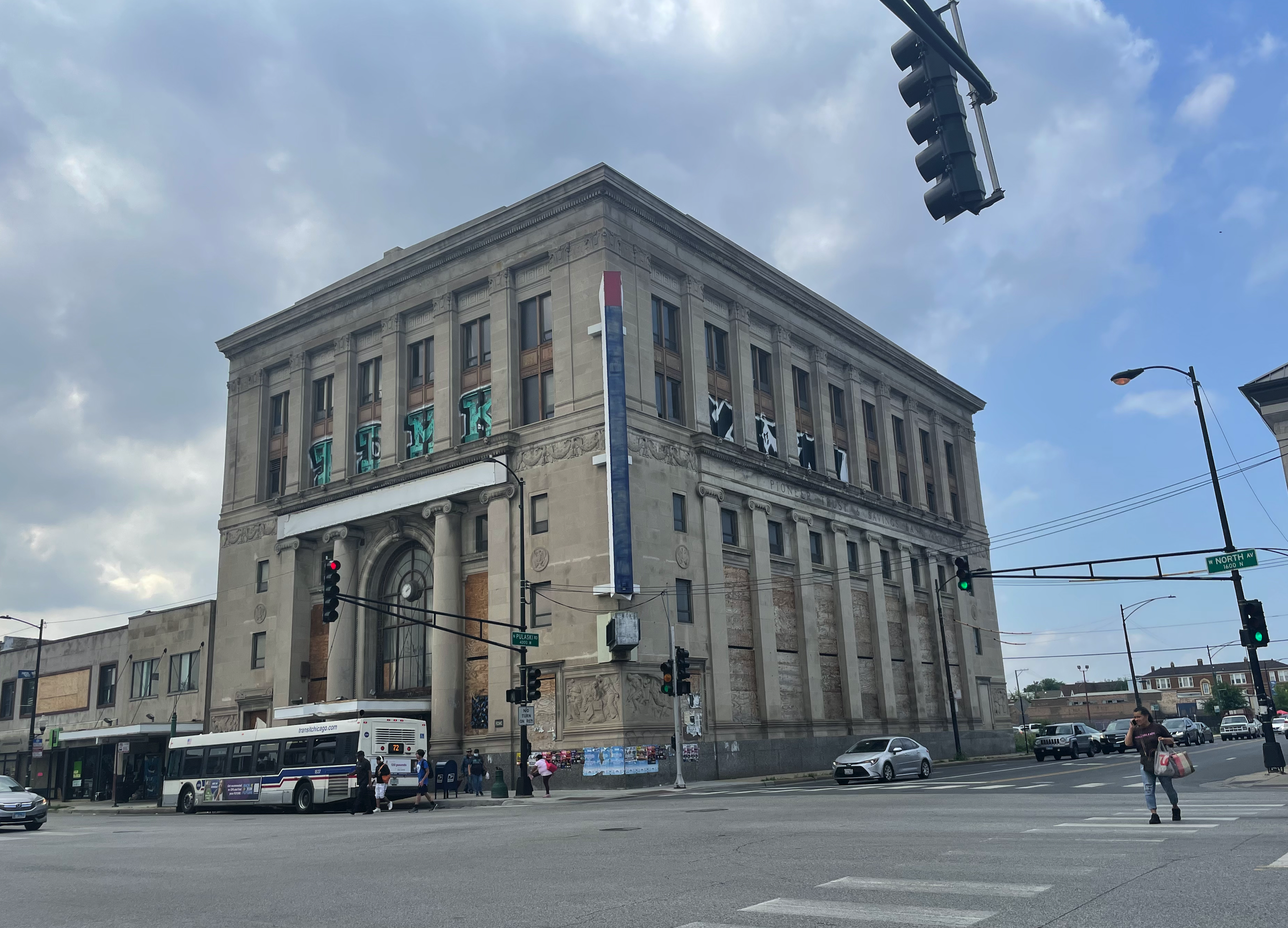
This boarded up example of classical-revival architecture stands prominently at the intersection of N. Pulaski/North Avenue. The building was dubbed "Chicago's most beautiful bank" upon its completion in 1926.

The Pioneer Trust and Savings Bank (former) is an abandoned historic Classical revival bank building and Chicago Landmark located at the intersection of North Avenue and N. Pulaski Road in the Chicago neighborhood of Humboldt Park.

Construction began in 1924 under the direction of architect Karl M. Vitzthum, and the 50,000 square foot building was completed two years later in 1926. Chicago's rapid growth through the turn of the century coincided with a period following the Panic of 1907 described as the "Golden age of bank architecture"; A time in which many of America's historic banks were built, and with a certain grandeur sufficient to: "Signal to the banking customer the notion that their money would be safe and the bank was here to stay.”

As Chicago continued to expand outwards into a "city of neighborhoods", banks such as the Pioneer Trust allowed these neighborhoods to thrive by providing the local businesses and residents with essential lending and other financial services. Indeed, this bank was built during a time when Humboldt Park experienced substantial growth - a period that spanned the first three decades of the 20th century, and consisted largely of German, Norwegian, Polish, and Italian immigrants who flocked to this area after being induced by the industrial jobs abundant on the city's northwest side near the Chicago and North Western Railway.

In the late 19th and early to mid 20th centuries, North Avenue was a bustling commercial row lined on both sides with a nearly continuous array of businesses, shops, and restaurants stretching for several miles. Like many banks, Pioneer Trust was intentionally built on this corner for it being a crossroads to the vibrant local market. In 1895, streetcars began operation on North avenue and would travel west down here on Pulaski, and in 1911, streetcars began running through Pulaski further propping this intersection up as a focal point for economic activity.

The bank demonstrated resilience throughout the Great Depression, and unlike many other banks in Chicago, Pioneer Trust survived the economic crisis. By the 1960s, it was one of the 300 largest commercial banks in the United States. In the mid-1990s, it was purchased by Puerto Rican based Banco Popular, showcasing the largely Hispanic and Latino American heritage of the local residents.

In 2012, the building was designated as a Chicago Landmark by the city, and it was listed on the National Register of Historic Places in 2023.

In April 2023, the City of Chicago approved a $13M redevelopment project for the building. It will be renovated into mixed-use spacing that will contain offices, for which several non-profits and an architecture firm will reside, in addition to a community cafe, restaurant, and one acre parking lot.

== See also ==
- List of Chicago Landmarks
- List of bank buildings
