= Headquarters of the Provincial Bank of Córdoba =

- Casa Central del Banco de la Provincia de Córdoba
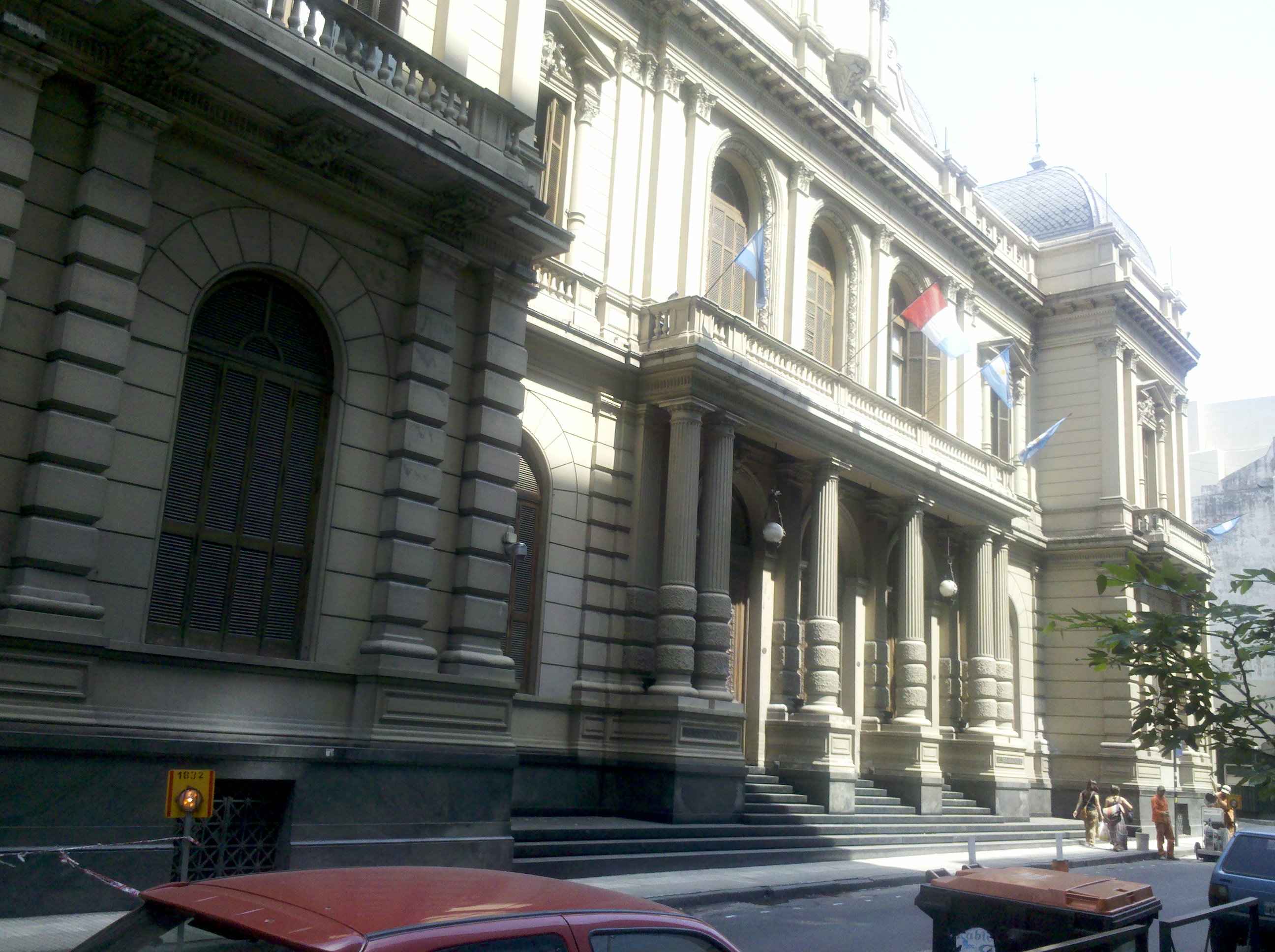
- View of main facade portico
- Alternative names: Banco de Córdoba Casa Central; Banco de Córdoba Casa Matriz

General information
- Architectural style: Eclecticism
- Location: Córdoba, Argentina
- Construction started: 1887
- Completed: 1889
- Inaugurated: 1889
- Client: Government of Córdoba Province

Design and construction
- Architect: Francesco Tamburini
- Engineer: José Franceschi
- Other designers: Arturo Nembrini Gonzaga (mural paintings)

National Historic Monument of Argentina

The Headquarters of the Provincial Bank of Córdoba (Spanish: Casa Central del Banco de la Provincia de Córdoba), more often referred locally as Banco de Córdoba Casa Central, is a large bank building in Córdoba, Argentina.

Inaugurated on 17 May 1889, it is one of the first buildings especially constructed for a financial institution in Latin America and is among the most important assets in the architectural heritage of Cordoba Province. It was declared a provincial historic monument in 1993 and a National Historic Landmark in 2000.

== History ==
The building was designed by the prestigious Italian Argentine architect Francesco Tamburini, who left his mark on some of the most emblematic local architecture, such as the Teatro Colón, the Casa Rosada, the Police Central Department Building in Buenos Aires; and the Teatro del Libertador General San Martín in Córdoba City. Construction began in 1887 under the technical direction of engineer José Franceschi.

The decoration of the headquarters' interiors is inspired in the Palace of Versailles, for which a wide variety of techniques and designs were applied. Inside the building stands the figure of Mercury, protector of merchants and guilds.

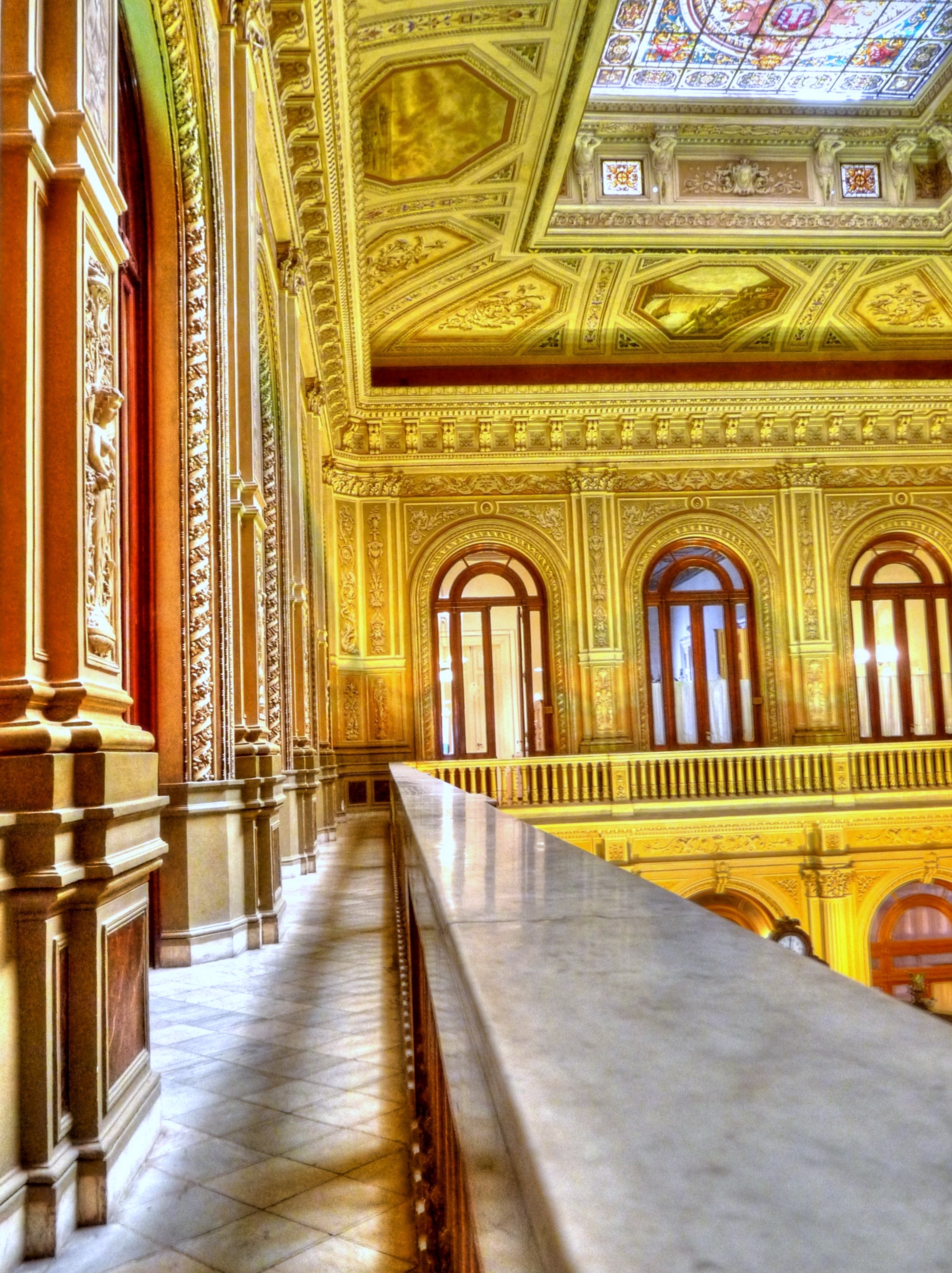
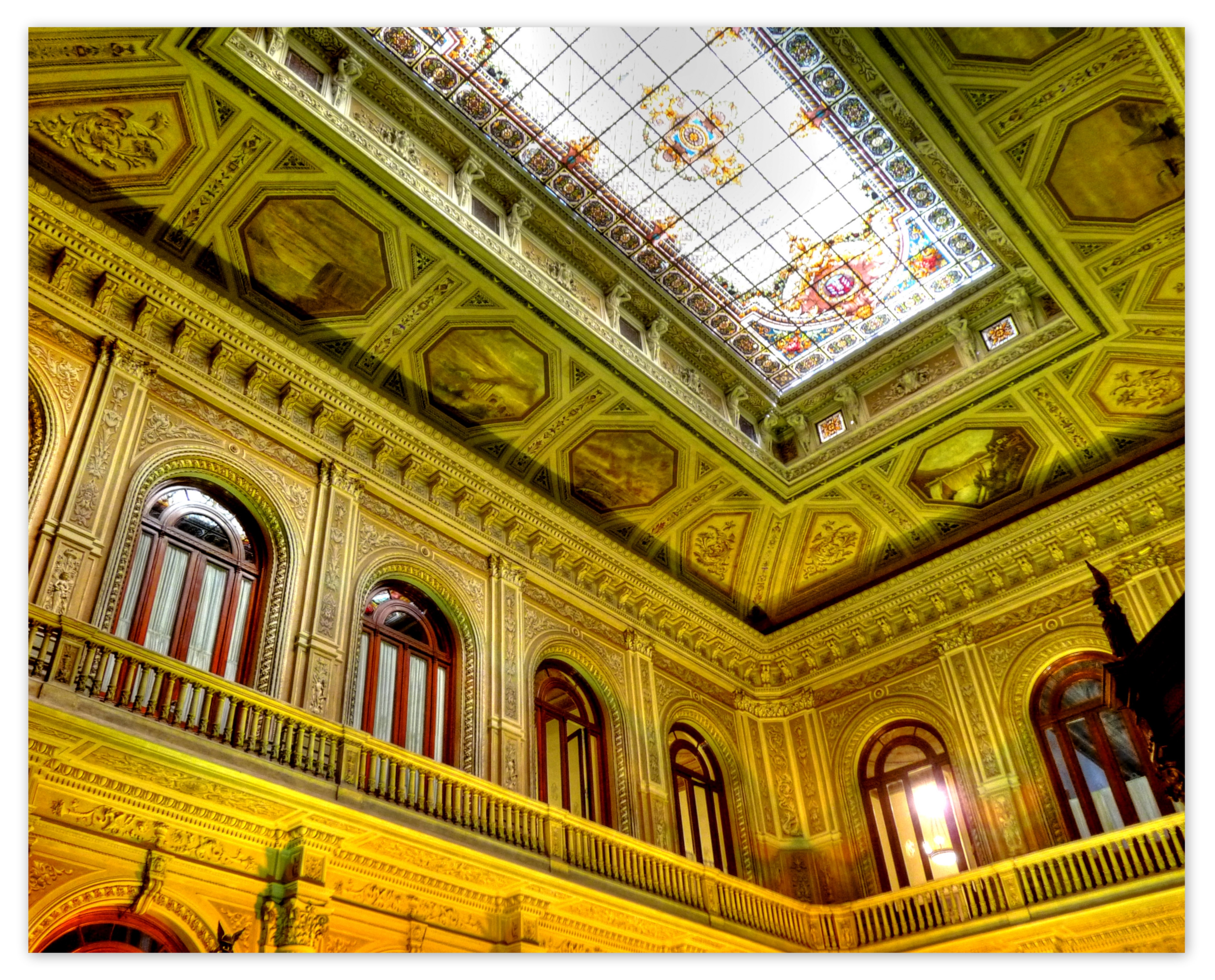
Interior decoration, inspired in the Palace of Versailles.

== See also ==
- Headquarters of the Bank of the Argentine Nation
- List of National Historic Monuments of Argentina
