= El Paso Bank =

- U.S. National Register of Historic Places
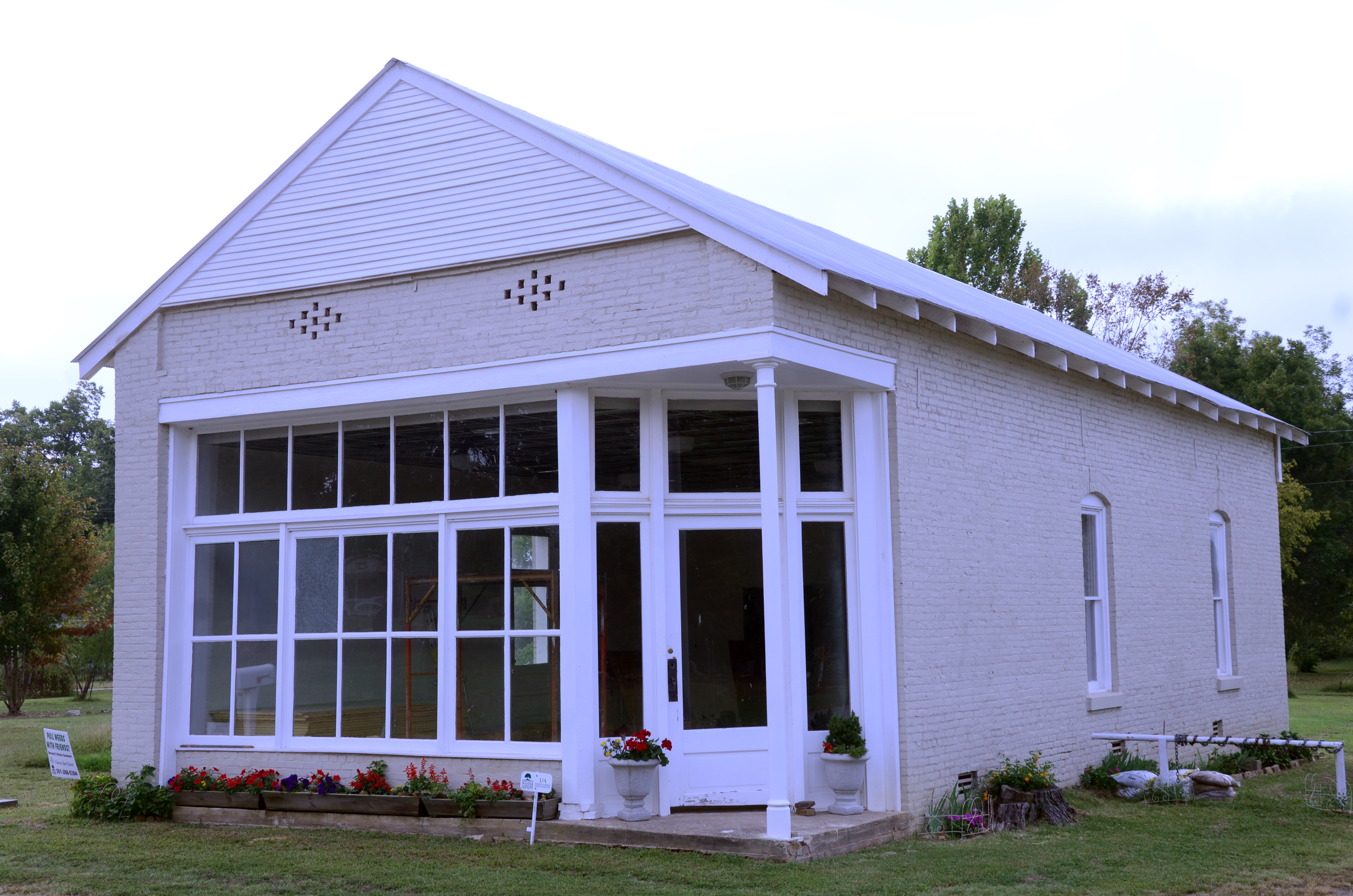

- Location within Arkansas Location within the United States
- Location: Co. Rd. 3 E of jct. with AR 5, El Paso, Arkansas
- Coordinates: 35°7′34″N 92°5′45″W
- Area: less than one acre
- Built: 1912
- Architectural style: Vernacular commercial
- MPS: White County MPS
- NRHP reference No.: 91001303
- Added to NRHP: September 5, 1991

The El Paso Bank is a historic commercial building on White County Road 3, east of Arkansas Highway 5 in El Paso, Arkansas. It is a vernacular single-story brick structure, with a front-facing gable roof. Its front facade has a fixed-frame window across much of its width, and the main entrance set at an angle on the right corner. A porch extends across the front, with remnants of latticework supported by turned posts. Built in 1912, it is the oldest surviving commercial building in the small community.

The building was listed on the National Register of Historic Places in 1991.

== See also ==
- National Register of Historic Places listings in White County, Arkansas
