= Municipal Theater of Santa Fe =

Coordinates: 31°39′09″S 60°42′29″W

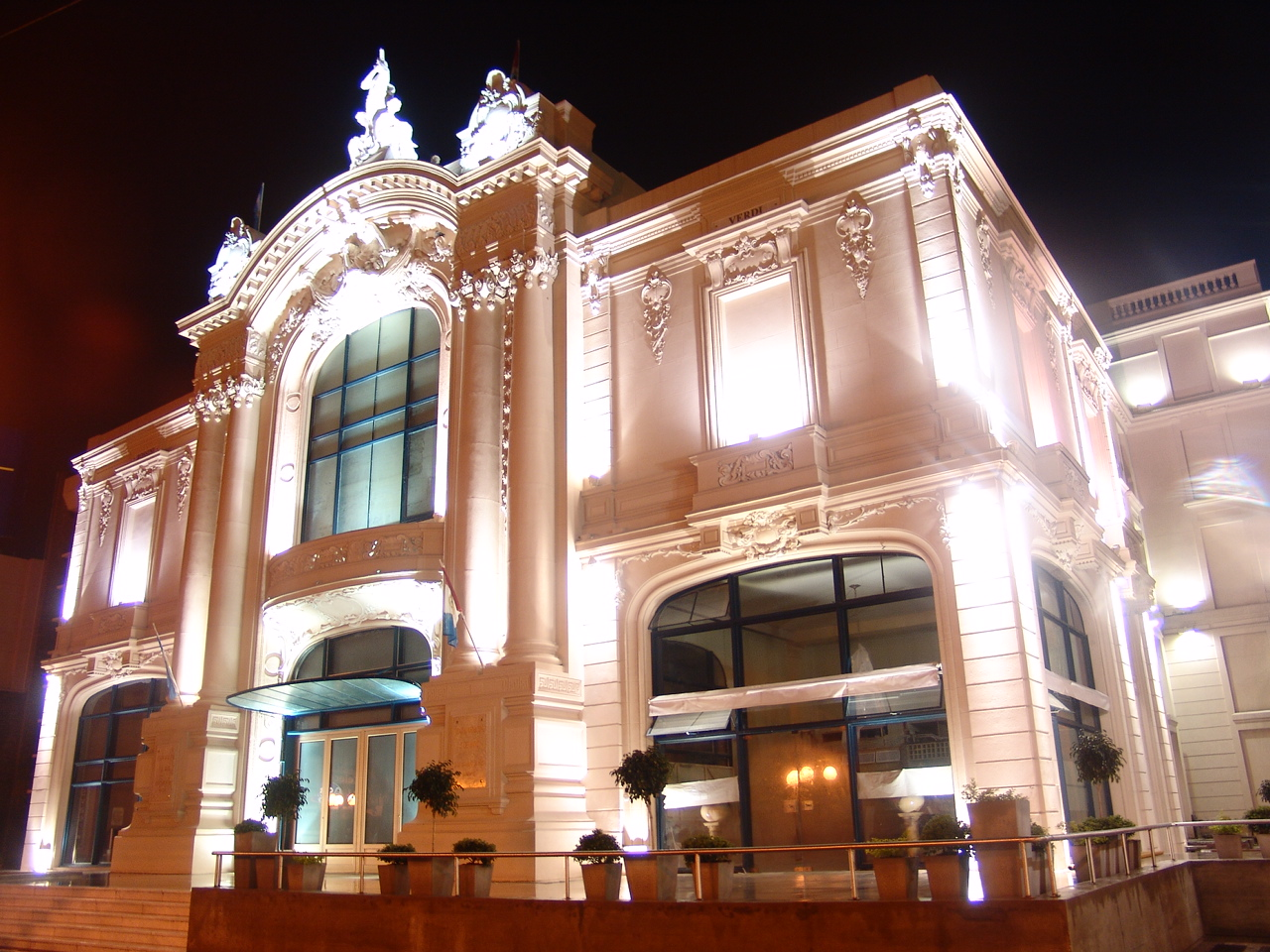
The Municipal Theater of Santa Fe

The May 1 Municipal Theater is the premier stage theater and concert hall in Santa Fe, Argentina.

== History and overview ==
The theatre arose from an initiative by Mayor Sixto Sandaza, who sought to remedy the growing city's lack of a formal concert hall or architecturally significant theater. The city is the capital of Santa Fe Province, was home to 35,000 inhabitants by the 1895 Census, and had doubled in population in merely a decade. The municipality commissioned French Argentine architect Augusto Plou to design the new institution, whose construction began in 1903.

Plou's design for a French Neoclassical exterior and interiors in the style of Louis XV resulted from the day's architectural tastes among Argentine high society and government planners, alike. The façade was crowned with sculptures by local artist Nicolás Gulli, representing allegories of music and dance.

The ornate theater was inaugurated on October 5, 1905. The institution's main hall, the Sala Mayor, seats an audience of 850, was decorated by painter Nazareno Orlandi, and is notable also for a spiderweb chandelier transferred from the city's colonial cabildo.

An extensive modernization was completed in 1973, including the installation of electronic stagecraft and lighting equipment, as well as central air conditioning. Two secondary halls were also opened at the time: the Leopoldo Marechal Salon, which seats 250, and the smaller Juan Franze Salon, which hosts ballet recitals.

On the occasion of the theater's upcoming centennial, Mayor Ezequiel Balbarrey commissioned its refurbishment, including the removal of the modern veranda (a visual obstacle on the façade). Inaugurated on May 25, 2005, the theater's restoration was awarded a second-place prize in the subsequent Ibero-American Cultural Patrimony Restoration Contest.
