= Bank of Los Banos Building =

Historic bank in California

- U.S. National Register of Historic Places
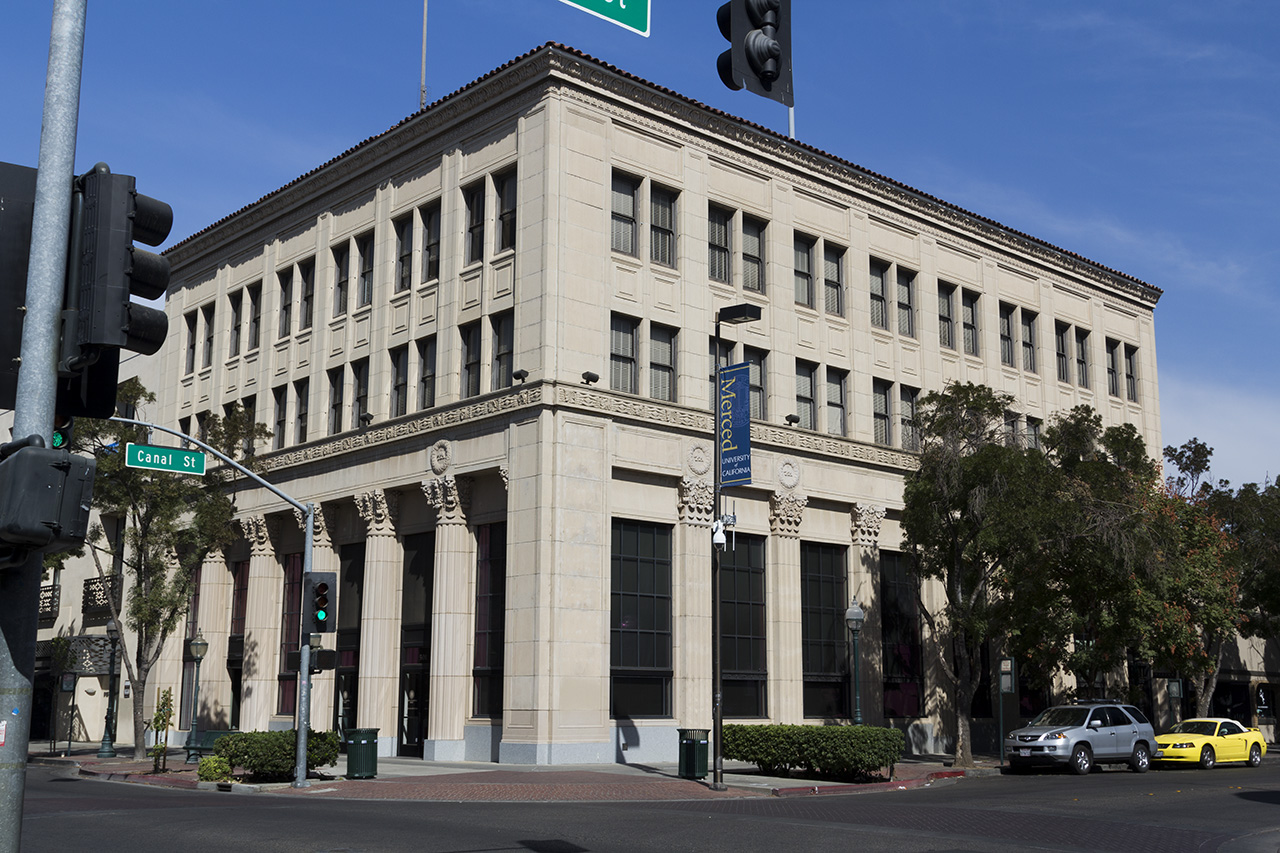

- Location within California Location within the United States
- Location: 836, 840, 842 and 848 6th St., Los Banos, California
- Coordinates: 37°3′40″N 120°50′48″W
- Area: 0.1 acres (0.040 ha)
- Built: 1925
- Built by: M.M. Finlayson
- Architect: H.H. Winner Co.
- Architectural style: Neoclassical
- NRHP reference No.: 79000500
- Added to NRHP: August 24, 1979

The Bank of Los Banos Building is a historic bank building located at 836–848 Sixth Street in Los Banos, California. Opened in 1925, the bank was designed to be a major business center in Los Banos, which lost most of its business district in a 1919 fire. The bank was built by Henry Miller and Charles Lux, prominent businessmen whose extensive holdings included land, cattle, and the San Joaquin and Kings River Canal and Irrigation Company. The building has a Neoclassical design which features wall surfaces resembling piers, a dentiled cornice, and seven bays on the front side, each containing a window or entrance. The original design also included a frieze decorated with cattle heads and garlands, though this was removed for safety reasons in the 1930s.

The Bank of Los Banos Building was added to the National Register of Historic Places on August 24, 1979.
