= Bank of Toronto (Yellowknife) =

Coordinates: 62.4700°N 114.3440°W

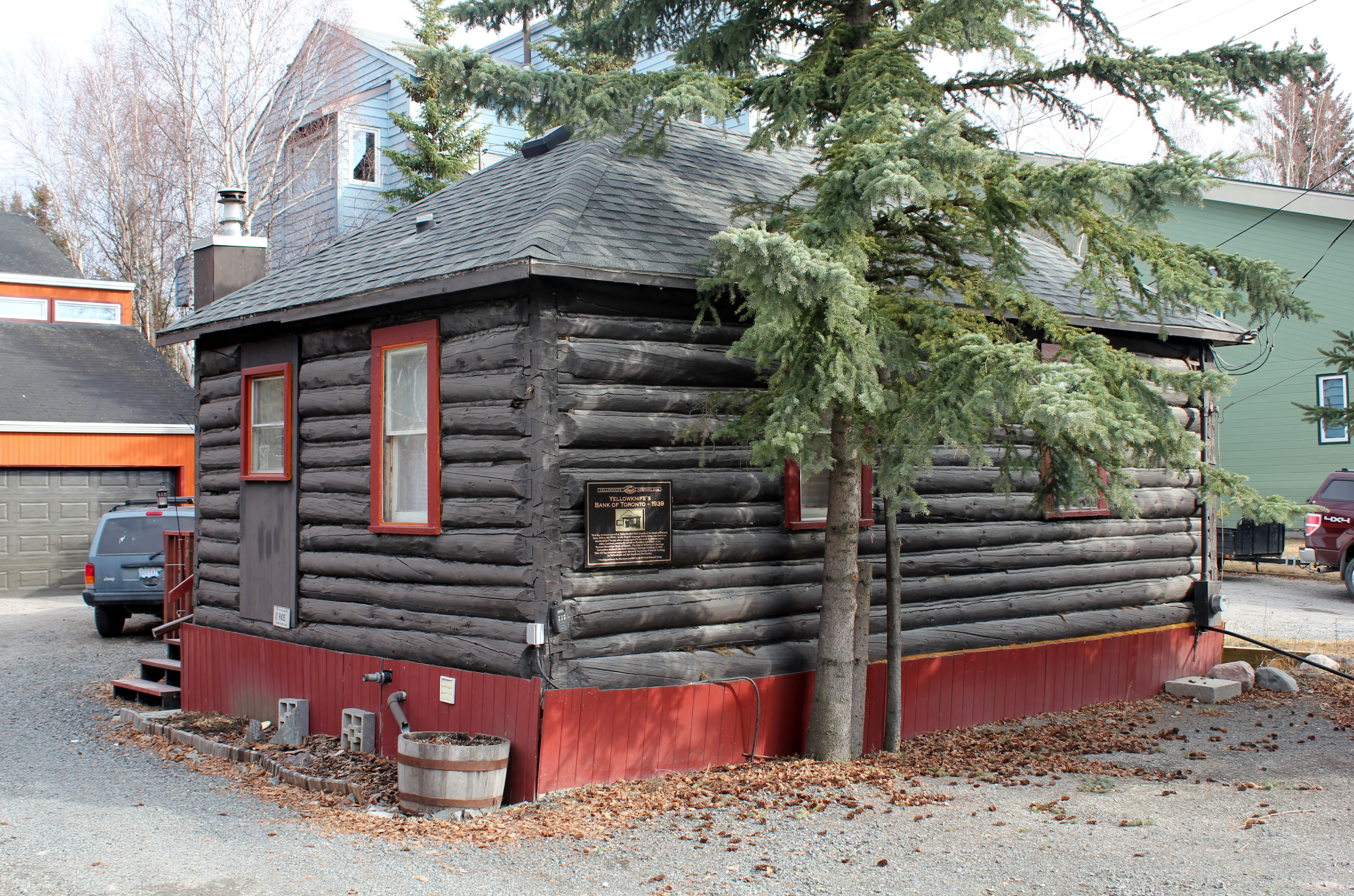
Bank of Toronto 1944-1951.

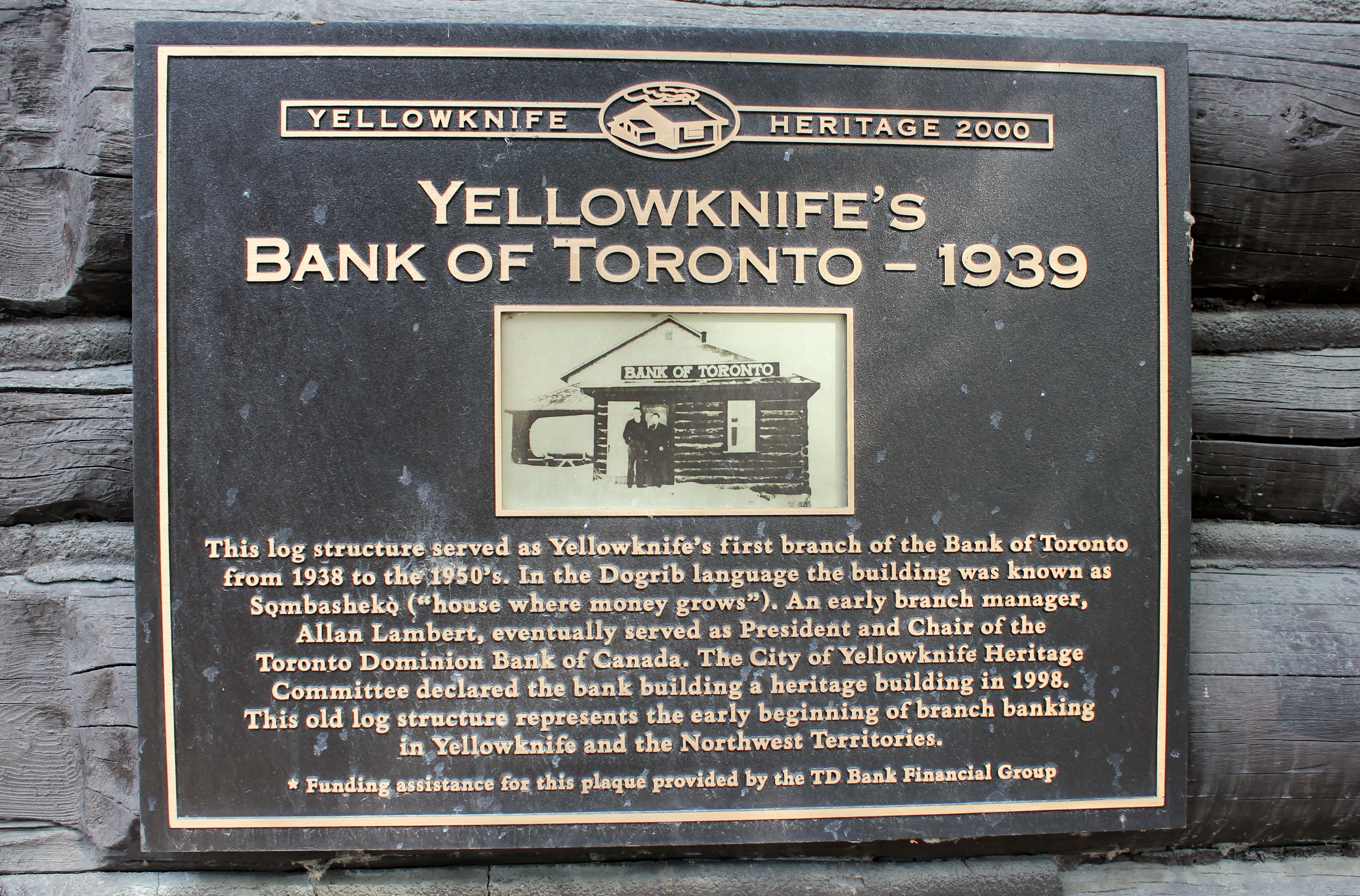
'Yellowknife Heritage 2000' Plaque

The Bank of Toronto is a historic cabin located in Old Town, Yellowknife, Northwest Territories, Canada. The log cabin was constructed in 1939 by John Stakson, an expert log builder, in the commercial district of the Yellowknife community for use as a residence. In October 1944, the Bank of Toronto purchased the cabin and opened a new bank for the community, joining the Bank of Commerce (Yellowknife's first bank in 1938). The bank arrived in Yellowknife in response to new financial activity brought about by the intersection of gold in shear zones at Giant Mine and the resulting staking spree around the region. As the gold rush ended, the volume of business was insufficient to keep the bank profitable, and the Bank of Toronto closed this branch in August 1951.

Purchased by prospector Sam Otto in 1964, the old log cabin was renovated and moved to its current location on Latham Island for use as a rental residence. The Bank of Toronto was designated a City of Yellowknife Heritage Site in 1998.
