= Delta County Bank Building =

- U.S. National Register of Historic Places
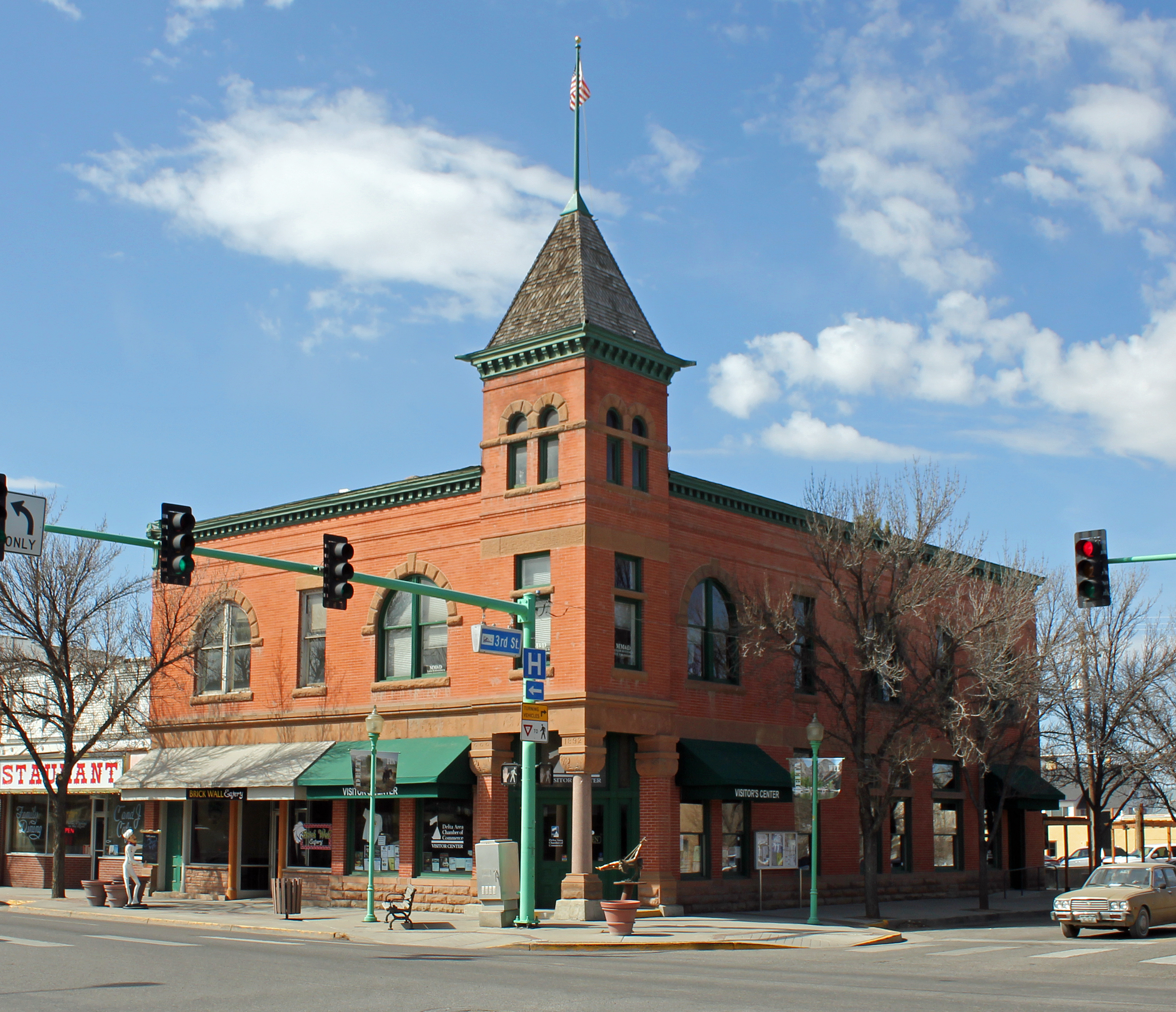

- Location within Colorado
- Location: 301 and 305 Main St., Delta, Colorado
- Coordinates: 38°44′34″N 108°04′14″W
- Area: less than one acre
- Built: 1892
- Architectural style: Romanesque
- NRHP reference No.: 93000577
- Added to NRHP: June 24, 1993

The Delta County Bank Building, on Main Street in Delta, Colorado, is a Romanesque Revival-style building constructed in 1892. It was listed on the National Register of Historic Places in 1993.

It has historically served as a department store, as a professional building, as a meeting hall, in addition to serving as a financial institution.

It is a two-story masonry building with a three -story corner tower, which somewhat dominates downtown Delta.
