= First National Bank (Mobile, Alabama) =

- U.S. National Register of Historic Places
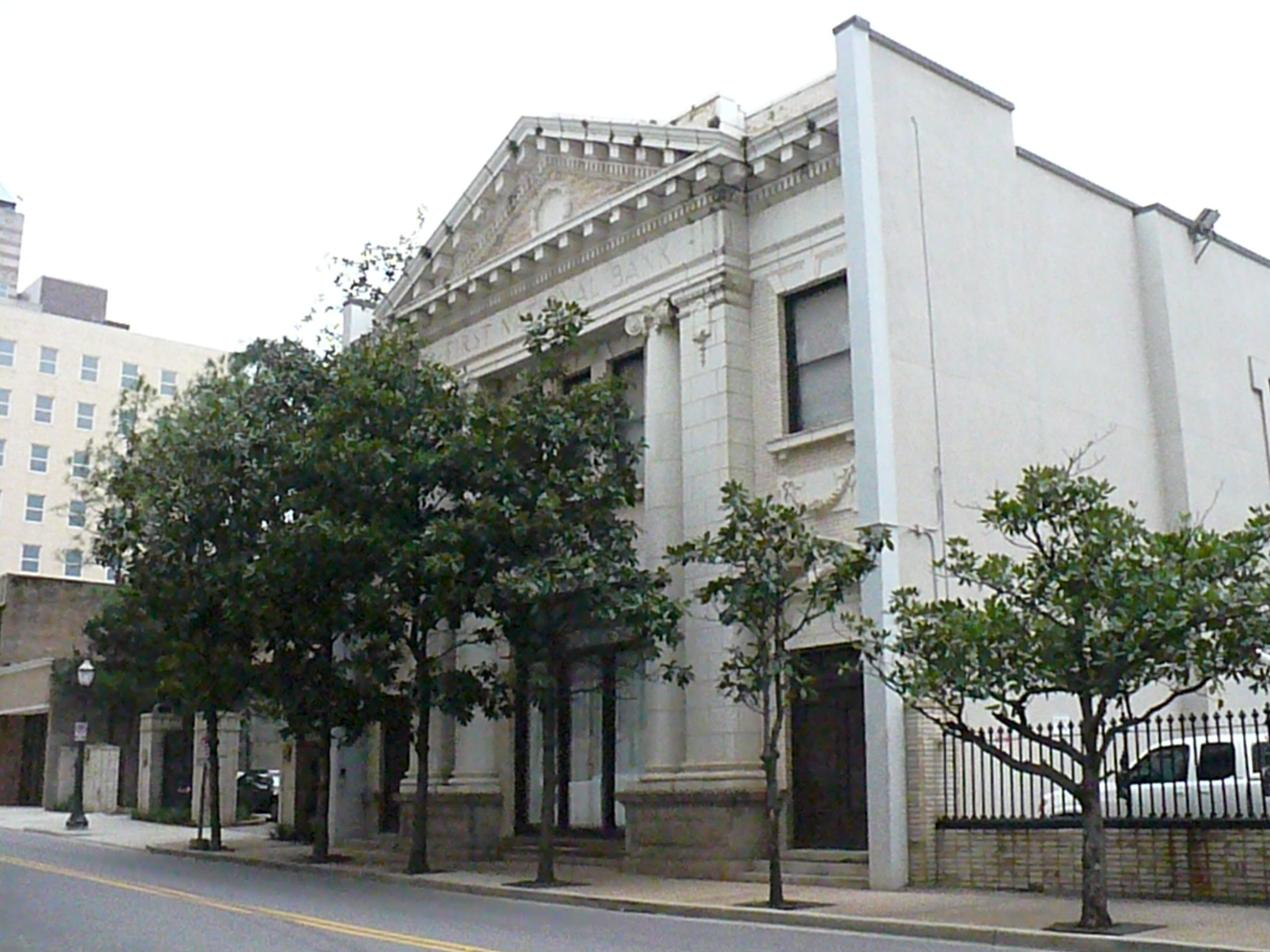

- Location within Mobile, Alabama Location within Alabama Location within the United States
- Location: 68 St. Francis Street, Mobile, Alabama
- Coordinates: 30°41′37″N 88°2′27″W
- Built: 1905
- Architect: Watkins, Hutchisson, & Garvin; Charles H. Owens
- Architectural style: Classical Revival
- NRHP reference No.: 78000504
- Added to NRHP: November 17, 1978

The First National Bank is a historic bank building in Mobile, Alabama. It was built in 1905 to the designs of local architectural firm Watkins, Hutchisson, and Garvin. The two-story masonry structure is in the Classical Revival style and features a brick and terracotta facade. It was placed on the National Register of Historic Places on November 17, 1978.
