= Bank of Fairhope =

- U.S. National Register of Historic Places
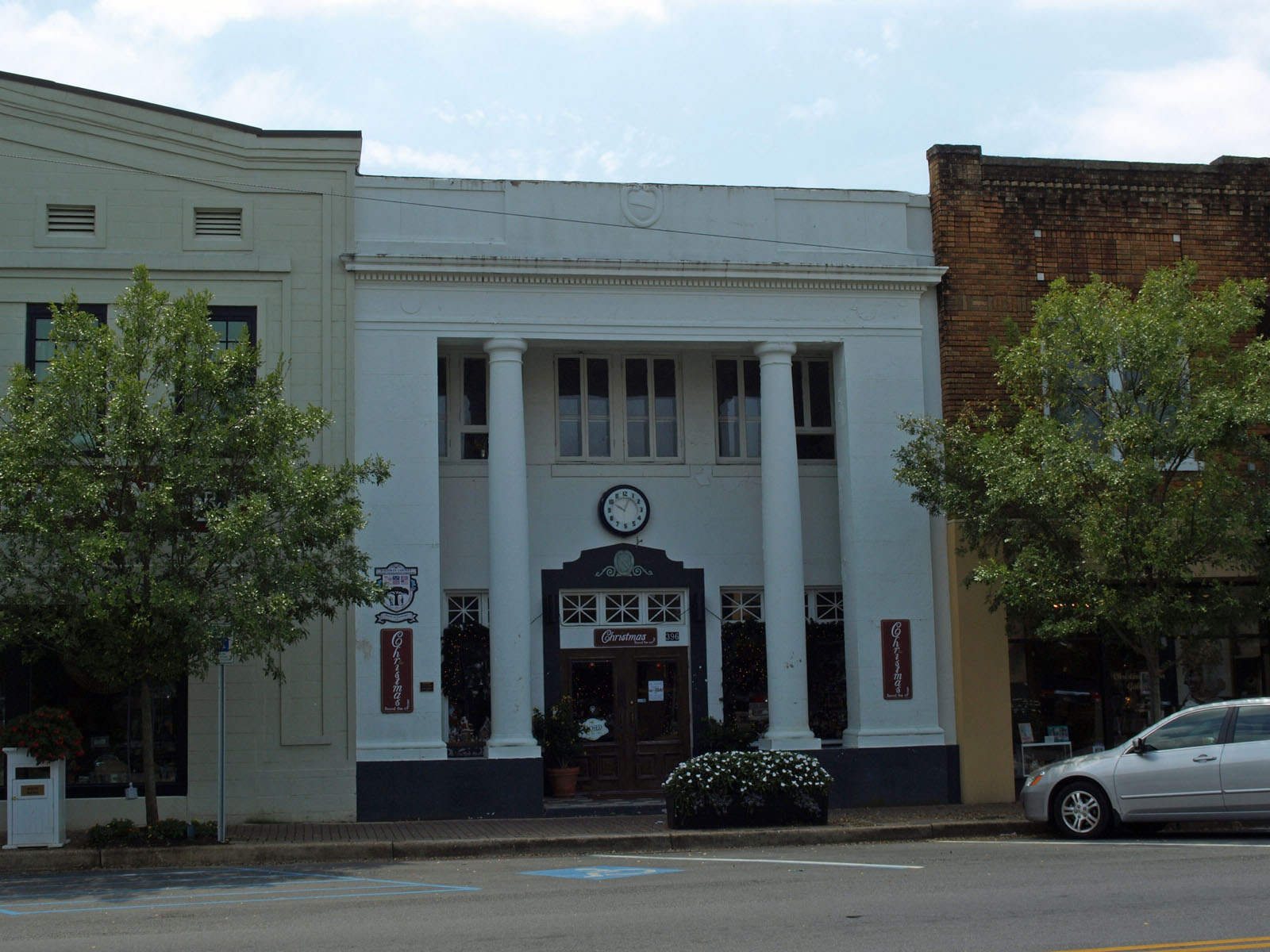

- Location within Alabama
- Location: 396 Fairhope Ave., Fairhope, Alabama
- Coordinates: 30°31′22″N 87°54′12″W
- Area: less than one acre
- Built: 1927
- Built by: M. Dyson and Co.
- Architect: William March
- Architectural style: Classical Revival
- MPS: Fairhope MRA
- NRHP reference No.: 88001008
- Added to NRHP: July 1, 1988

The Bank of Fairhope, at 396 Fairhope Ave. in Fairhope, Alabama, United States, was built in 1927. It was listed on the National Register of Historic Places in 1988.

It has also been known as the Press Register Building. It was designed by Mobile architect William March in Classical Revival style. It was built of hollow clay tile supplied by the Clay Products Company, a local firm.
