= Calaveras County Bank =

- U.S. National Register of Historic Places
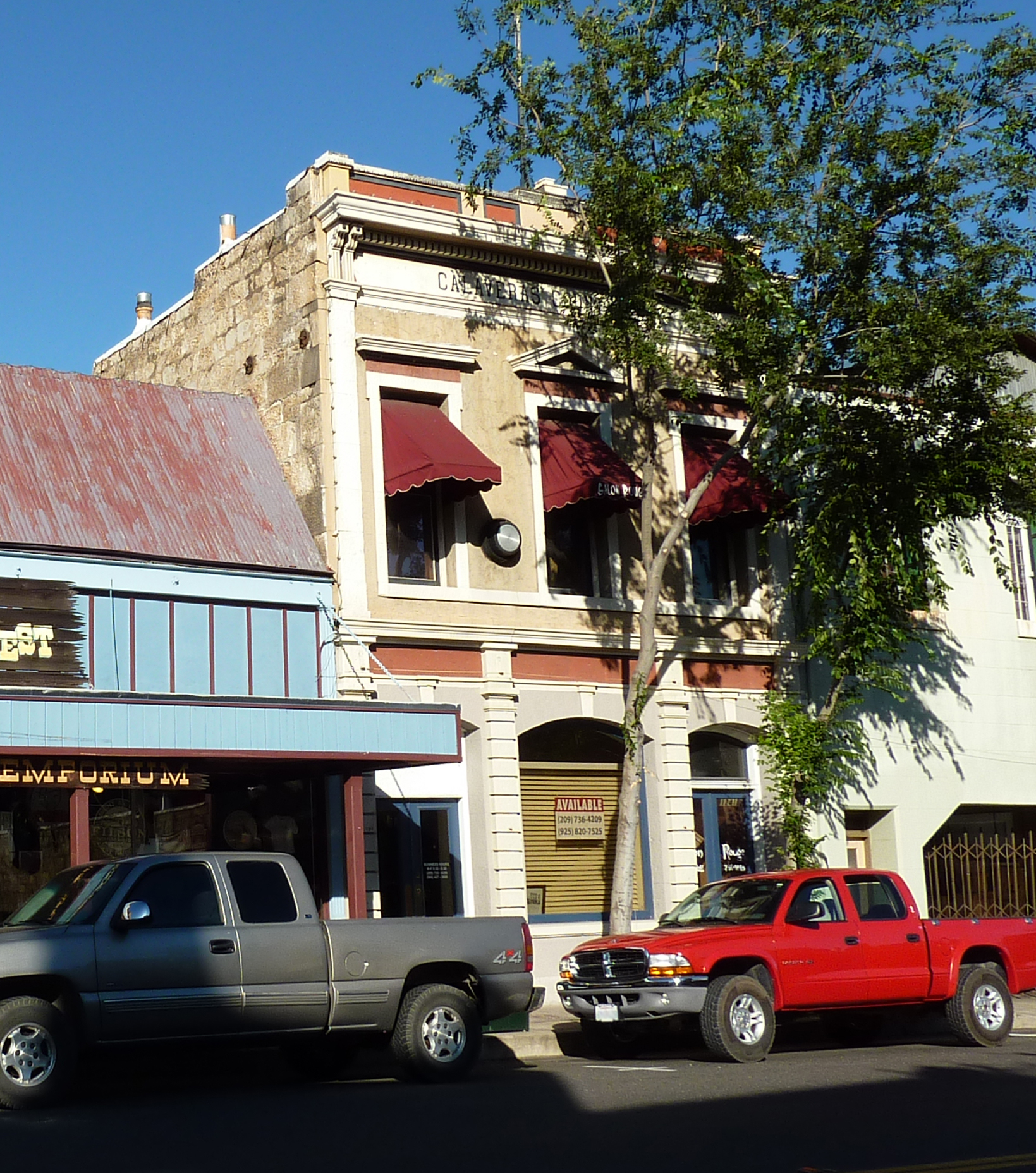

- Location within California Location within the United States
- Location: 1239 Main St., Angels Camp, California
- Coordinates: 38°4′11″N 120°32′22″W
- Area: 0.1 acres (0.040 ha)
- Built: 1900
- Architect: Righetti, Perseo; Depierre, E.
- Architectural style: Classical Revival
- NRHP reference No.: 85001683
- Added to NRHP: August 1, 1985

The Calaveras County Bank is a historic bank building located at 1239 Main St. in Angels Camp, California. The two-story Classical Revival building was built in 1900 and designed by architects E. Depierre and Perseo Righetti of San Francisco. The bank's design features an iron boxed cornice with brackets on each end and stone pilasters on both sides. The second floor has three double-hung sash windows, while the first floor has a picture window flanked by two entrances; all three first floor openings are topped with rounded arches. The interior trim of the bank used a variety of different woods, a rarity in contemporary buildings in the area. The bank was the first to be incorporated in Calaveras County, and the building was the first in the county designed specifically to house a bank; until the 1920s, it was also the only bank operating in the county. In 1930, the Calaveras County Bank merged with the Bank of Italy and moved to a new building. The old bank building housed a meat market from 1937 to 1980 and later held a branch of the Central Sierra Bank.

The Calaveras County Bank was added to the National Register of Historic Places on August 1, 1985.
