= Headquarters of the Bank of the Argentine Nation =

- Casa Central del Banco de la Nación Argentina
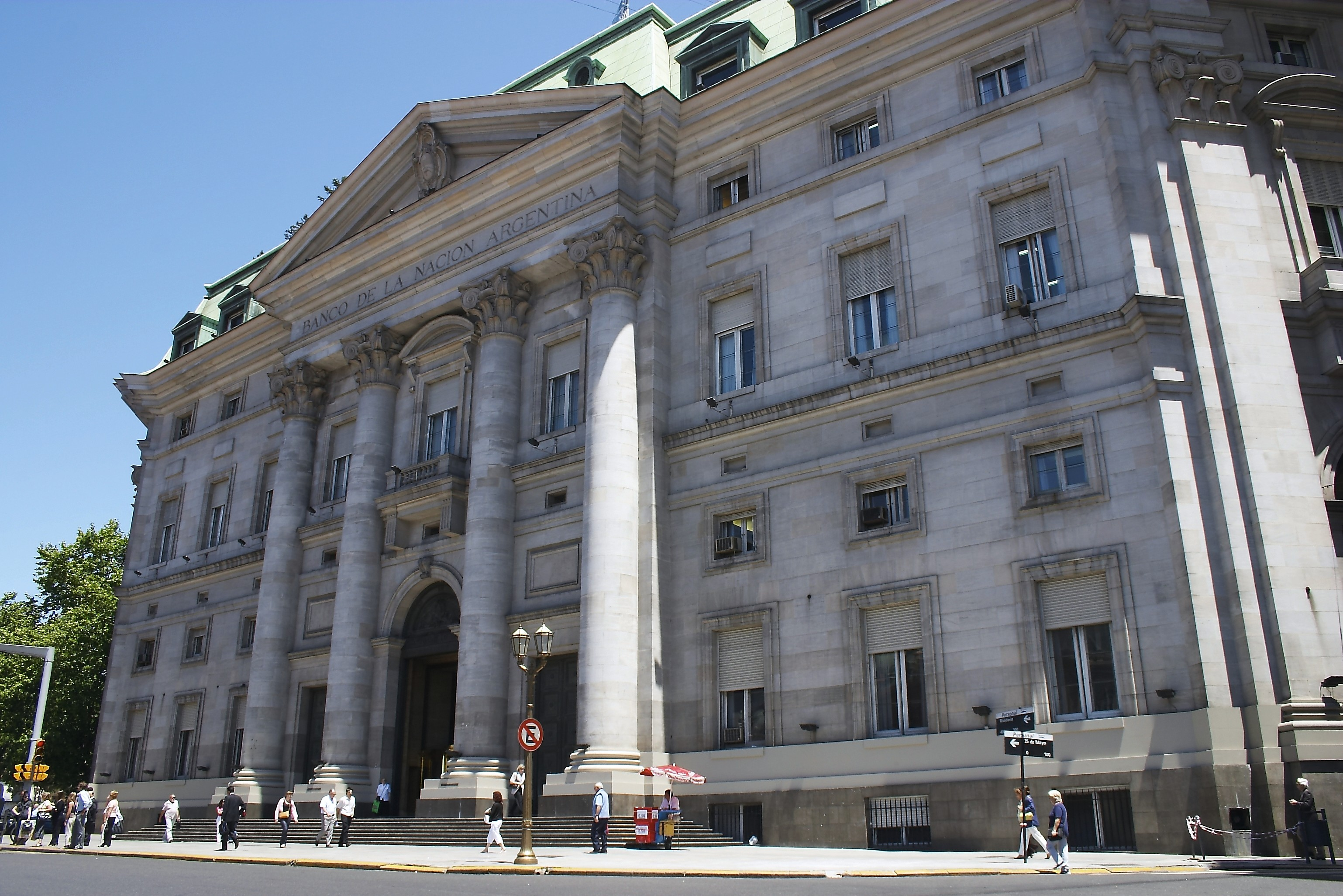
- View of main facade portico

- Location within Buenos Aires
- Alternative names: Banco Nación Casa Central

General information
- Architectural style: Monumental Neoclassical
- Location: Bartolomé Mitre 326, Buenos Aires, Argentina
- Coordinates: 34°36′26″S 58°22′17″W
- Construction started: 1940
- Completed: 1955 (final details)
- Inaugurated: 1944
- Client: Government of Argentina

Technical details
- Structural system: Reinforced concrete
- Floor count: 9
- Floor area: 100,000 m^{2} (1,100,000 sq ft)

Design and construction
- Architect: Alejandro Bustillo

National Historic Monument of Argentina

The Headquarters of the Bank of the Argentine Nation (Spanish: Casa Central del Banco de la Nación Argentina), more often referred locally as Banco Nación Casa Central, is a monumental bank building next to the Plaza de Mayo, founding site of Buenos Aires and host of major events in the history of the country.

Designed by renowned Argentine architect Alejandro Bustillo in a Neoclassical style with French influences, the 100,000 m^{2} (1,100,000 sq ft) building occupies an entire city block and was inaugurated in 1944. The building is located close to Casa Rosada, which is the official workplace of the President of the Argentine Republic. The current building has a stone facade, granite floors, and mahogany and cedar-paneled walls.

With a dome 50 m (160 ft) in diameter, the building is a National Historic Landmark.

== History ==
The headquarters are located in the San Nicolás neighborhood of Buenos Aires on the site of the Teatro Colón's first building, bought by the national government in 1888 and later designated as main offices of the recently founded national bank. The edifice was remodeled in 1910 by architect Adolfo Büttner to better suit its new role.

In 1938 Alejandro Bustillo presented a new design for a much larger, 100,000 m^{2} (1,100,000 sq ft) structure, which was built in two stages between 1940 and 1955.

Architectural evolution of the Headquarters of the Bank of the Argentine Nation

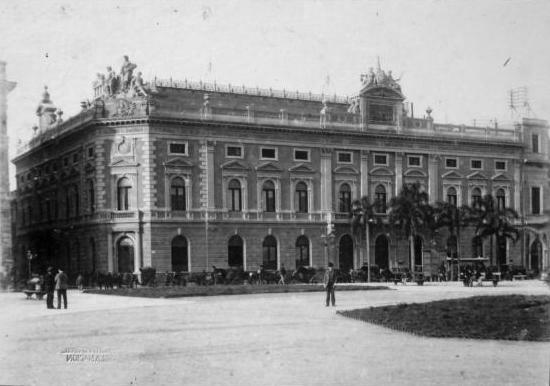
Original building of the Teatro Colón c. 1880

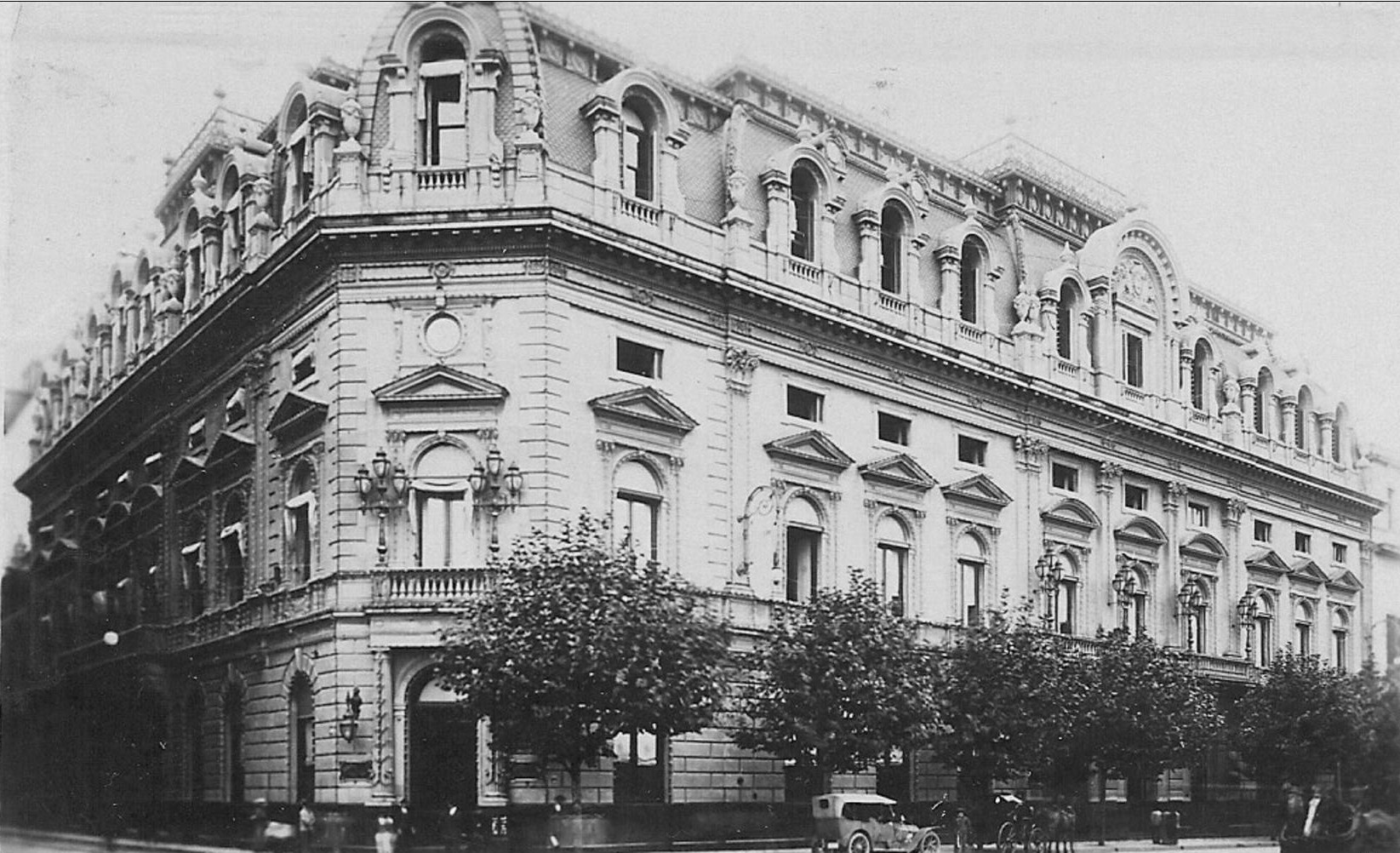
Adolfo Büttner's remodel in 1910

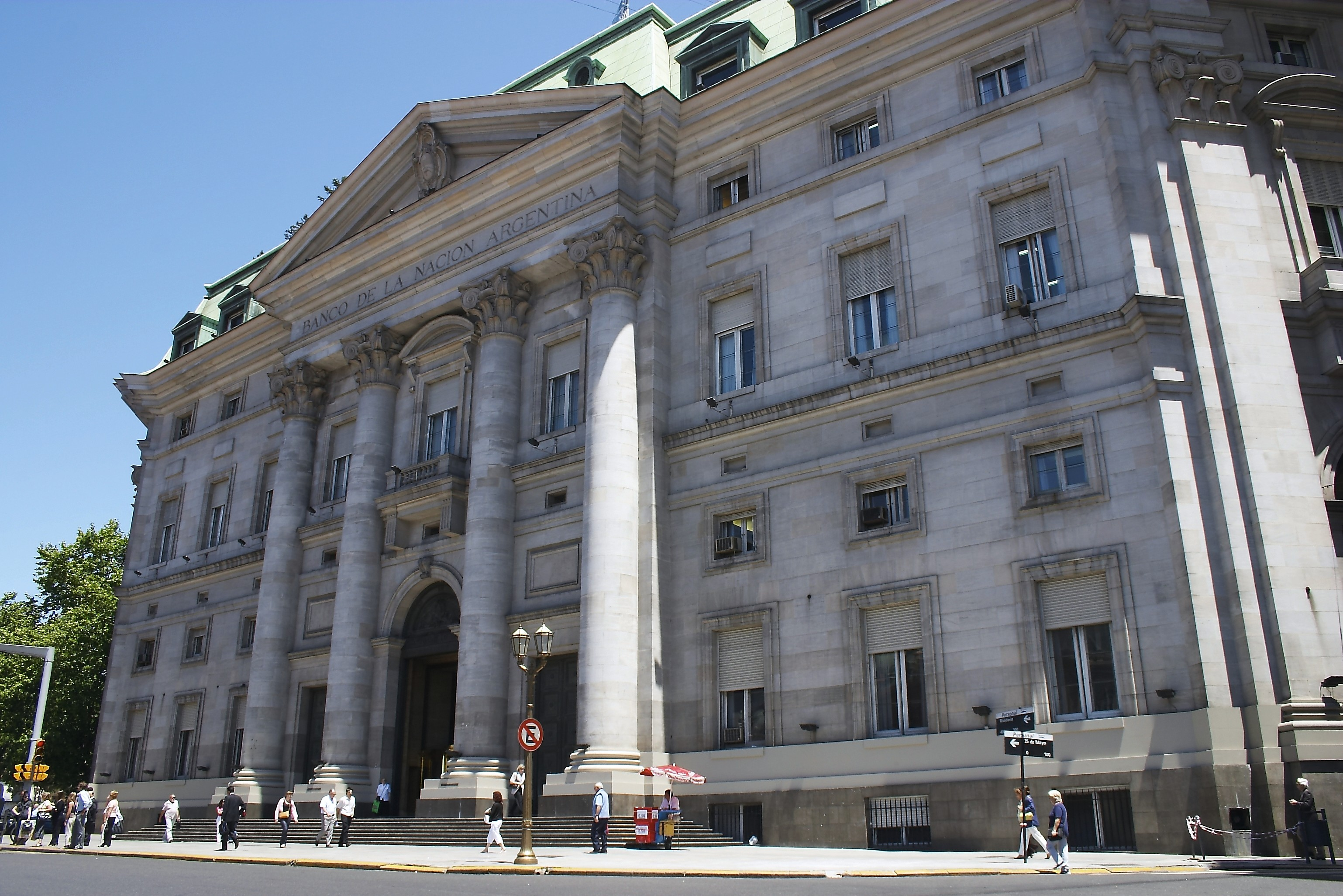
Current Neoclassical building by Alejandro Bustillo

The building is also home to the Alejandro Bustillo Art Gallery, established in 1971, as well as to a historic and numismatic museum.

== See also ==
- Headquarters of the Provincial Bank of Córdoba
- List of National Historic Monuments of Argentina
- Bank of the Argentine Nation
