= Bank of Ensley =

- U.S. National Register of Historic Places
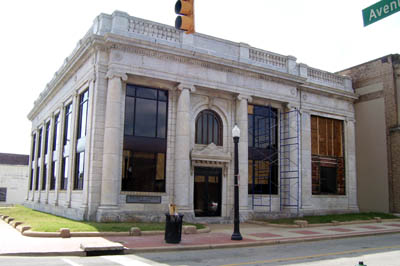

- Location within Alabama Location within the United States
- Location: 19th St. and Ave. E, Birmingham, Alabama
- Coordinates: 33°30′47″N 86°53′50″W
- Area: less than one acre
- Built: 1918
- Architect: H.O. Breeding
- Architectural style: Classical Revival
- NRHP reference No.: 84000623
- Added to NRHP: June 21, 1984

The Bank of Ensley, at 19th Street and Avenue East in Birmingham, Alabama, United States, was built in 1918. It was listed on the National Register of Historic Places in 1984.

The bank was organized in 1899 and was the first bank in the western section of Birmingham. Three years after this building was built, the president and vice-president sold the business to a vice president and a former cashier. The bank "flourished" through the 1920s, but failed on January 10, 1930.

The building, designed by local architect H.O. Breeding, is Classical Revival in style.
