= Rex Theatre (Whitewood) =

Coordinates: 50.3298°N 102.2670°W

Rex Theatre (Whitewood Historical Museum)
- Interactive map of the Rex Theatre (Whitewood Historical Museum) area

General information
- Location: 714 Lalonde Street, Whitewood, Saskatchewan, Canada
- Construction started: 1906
- Completed: 1907
- Client: Merchant's Bank

The Rex Theatre building is located at 714 Lalonde Street in Whitewood, Saskatchewan, Canada. The building is a designated Heritage Property. Originally built to house the Merchant's Bank, the building was later used to house the Theatre, with the removal of the second story the building was adapted to house a telephone exchange, later a retail outlet and finally a museum. The building currently houses the Whitewood Historical Museum.
