= Peoples Building & Loan Building =

- U.S. National Register of Historic Places
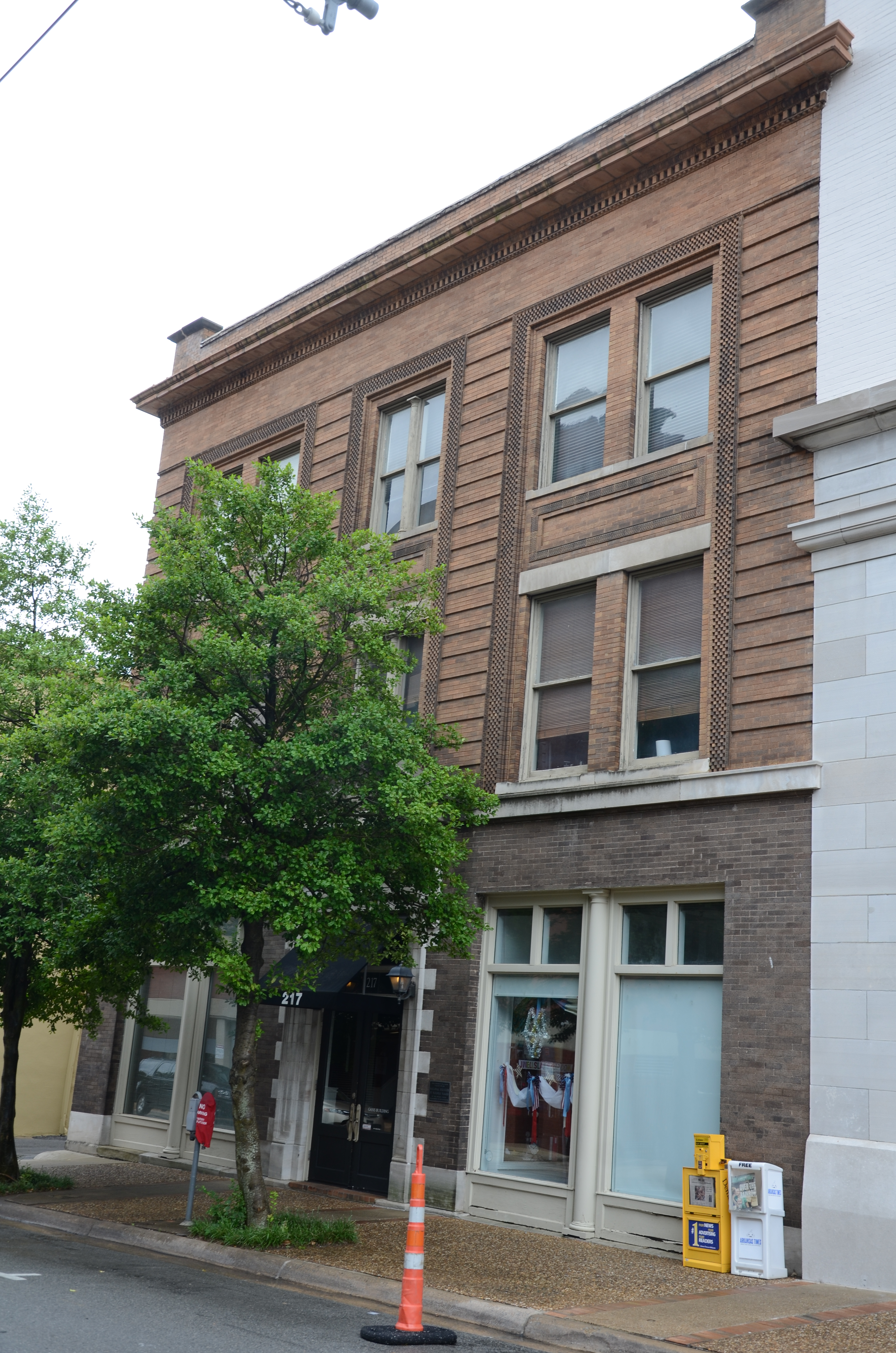

- Location within Arkansas Location within the United States
- Location: 213-217 W. 2nd St., Little Rock, Arkansas
- Coordinates: 34°45′8″N 92°16′42″W
- Area: less than one acre
- Built: 1903
- Architectural style: Prairie School
- NRHP reference No.: 82002129
- Added to NRHP: September 2, 1982

The Peoples Building & Loan Building is a historic commercial building at 213-217 West 2nd Street in Little Rock, Arkansas. It is a small three story masonry structure, its exterior finished in brick, limestone, and terra cotta. Upper floor windows are set in vertically oriented groupings with surrounding bands of checkered brickwork, and with horizontally banded lines of brick between them and at the corners. The ground floor retail window bays are divided by Ionic pilasters. Built in 1903, the building represents an unusually early precursor to the Prairie School of design.

The building was listed on the National Register of Historic Places in 1982.

== See also ==
- National Register of Historic Places listings in Little Rock, Arkansas
