= Teatro del Libertador General San Martín =

Coordinates: 31°25′09″S 64°11′16″W

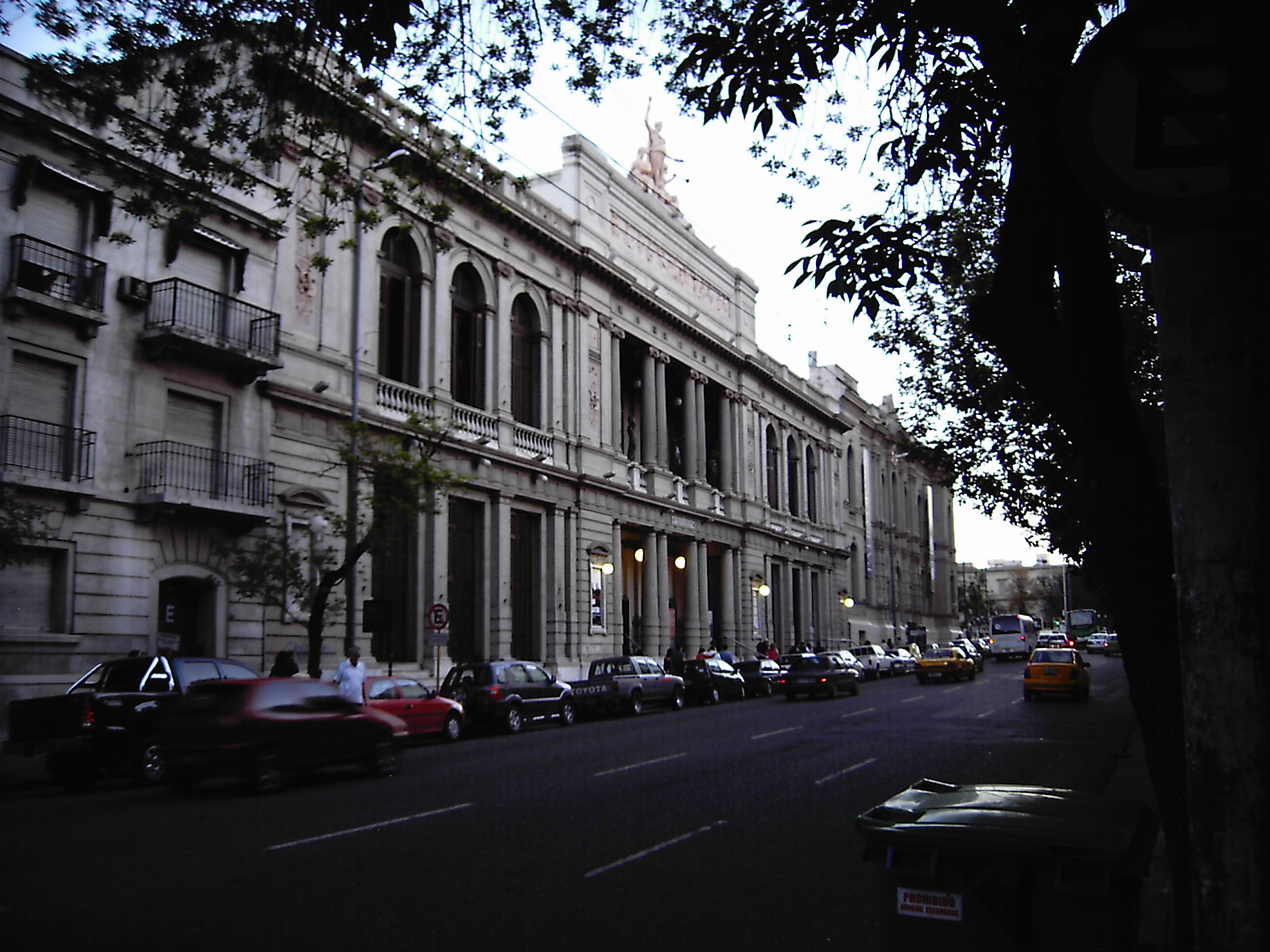
Libertador San Martín Theatre

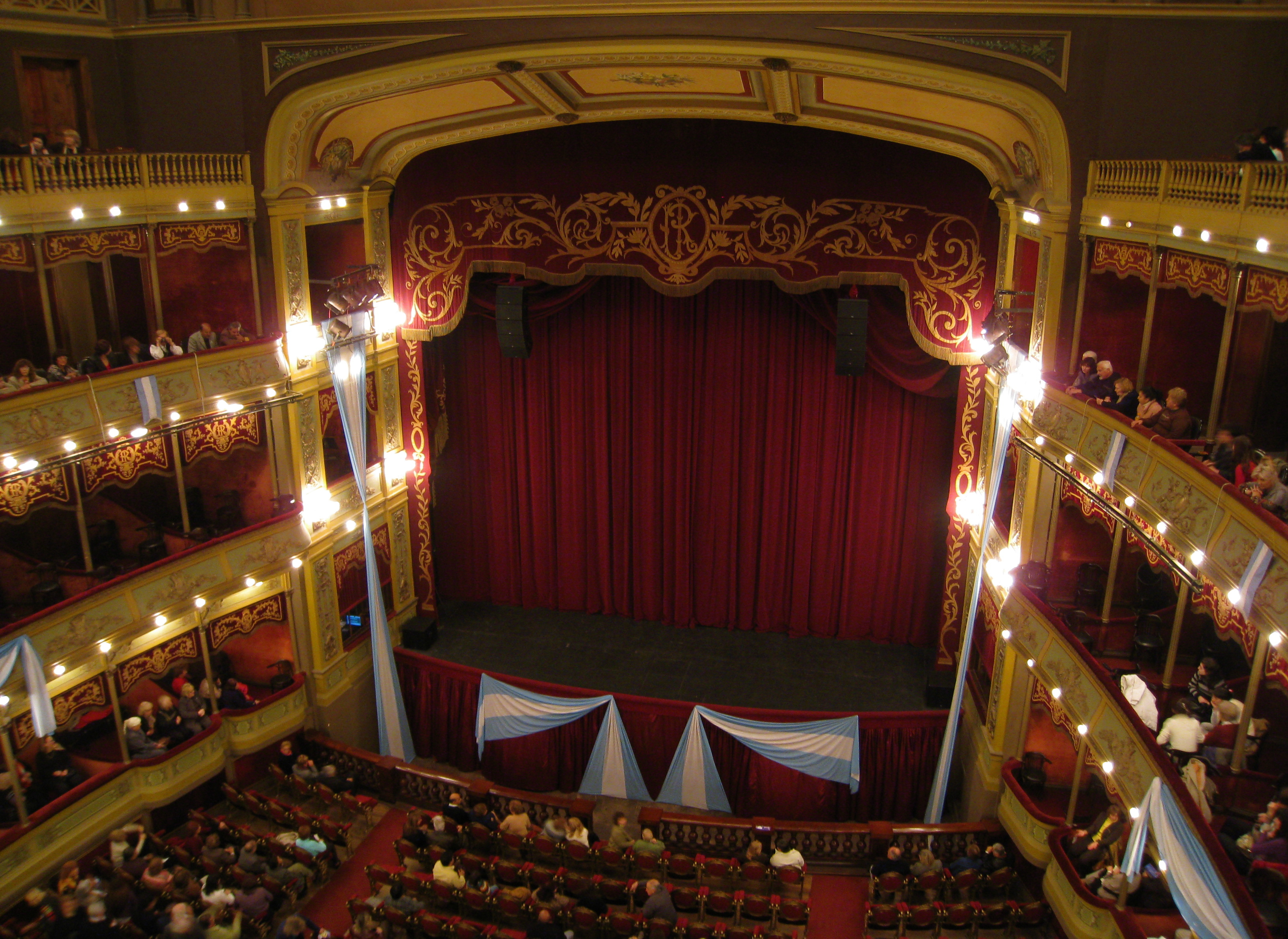
View of the concert hall

The Teatro del Libertador General San Martín (or more commonly, Teatro del Libertador or Teatro Libertador) is the premier stage theatre, opera house and concert hall in Córdoba, Argentina.

== Overview ==
Noting the absence of a concert hall in his native Córdoba, Provincial Justice Minister Ramón J. Cárcano proposed the establishment of one to Governor Ambrosio Olmos in 1887. After securing the project's approval and funding from the Córdoba Legislature, Cárcano commissioned a fellow Italian Argentine - architect Francesco Tamburini - for the project's design. Creating an eclectic Italianate theatre, Tamburini's design was juxtaposed with Arturo Nembrini Gonzaga's interior verdigris accents, façade reliefs and quadriga, all nods to the Beaux Arts architecture so in demand in Argentina at the time. The entirety of the theatre's materials, fabrics and machinery was imported for the purpose from Europe.

The landmark institution was inaugurated on April 26, 1891, as the Rivera Indarte Theatre. Popularly known as the Teatro de la Calle Ancha ("Broad Street Theatre") during the early 20th century (Broad Street was later renamed Vélez Sársfield Avenue), the grand concert hall was designed for a capacity of 1,000 spectators. Its concert hall featured a rising floor to stage level, made available during the many social balls held there since then. Among the first prominent drama theatre directors to stage productions there was María Guerrero, who popularized the theatre of Spain in Argentina after 1897. Subsequent years saw numerous internationally renowned classical performers, as well, notably Enrico Caruso, Titta Ruffo, Tito Schipa and Arthur Rubinstein.

The theatre additionally houses the Luis de Tejeda and Rafael Grisolía halls, each with capacities of around 100 and mainly reserved for seminars, as well as for the theatre's Youth Orchestra. A museum of the institution's extensive stagecraft collection was organized into the Cristóbal de Aguilar Musical and Theatre Museum in 1970.

The institution was renamed in honor of General José de San Martín in 1950 by order of President Juan Perón on the occasion of the centennial of the Liberator's death. It was renamed Rivera Indarte in 1956 (following Perón's overthrow), and regained the San Martín denomination in 1973.

== Sources ==
- Gobierno de la Provincia de Córdoba: Teatro del Libertador (in Spanish)
