= Francesco Tamburini =

Italian architect (1846–1891)

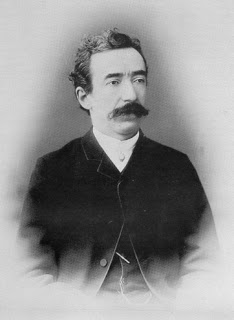
Francesco Tamburini (1846-1891)

Francesco Tamburini (1846 in Ascoli Piceno, Italy – 1891 in Buenos Aires, Argentina) was an Italian-born architect who designed many important architectural landmarks in Argentina.

He studied architecture in Italy and arrived in Argentina in 1881 where he was employed as Inspector General of National Architecture from 1883 until his death in 1891.

His works included the Headquarters of the Provincial Bank of Córdoba, the enlargement of the Casa Rosada, the Central Military Hospital and the initial designs for the Teatro Colón, a project that was completed by Vittorio Meano and Julio Dormal in 1908.

He worked on designs for the Palace of Justice, the Federal Police Headquarters, the Palace of Congress, among other government offices. He also designed some private houses for Zorilla, Tricogen, Besail, Blauco, Gentili, and for himself.
