= American National Bank Building (Alamosa, Colorado) =

- U.S. National Register of Historic Places
- Colorado State Register of Historic Properties
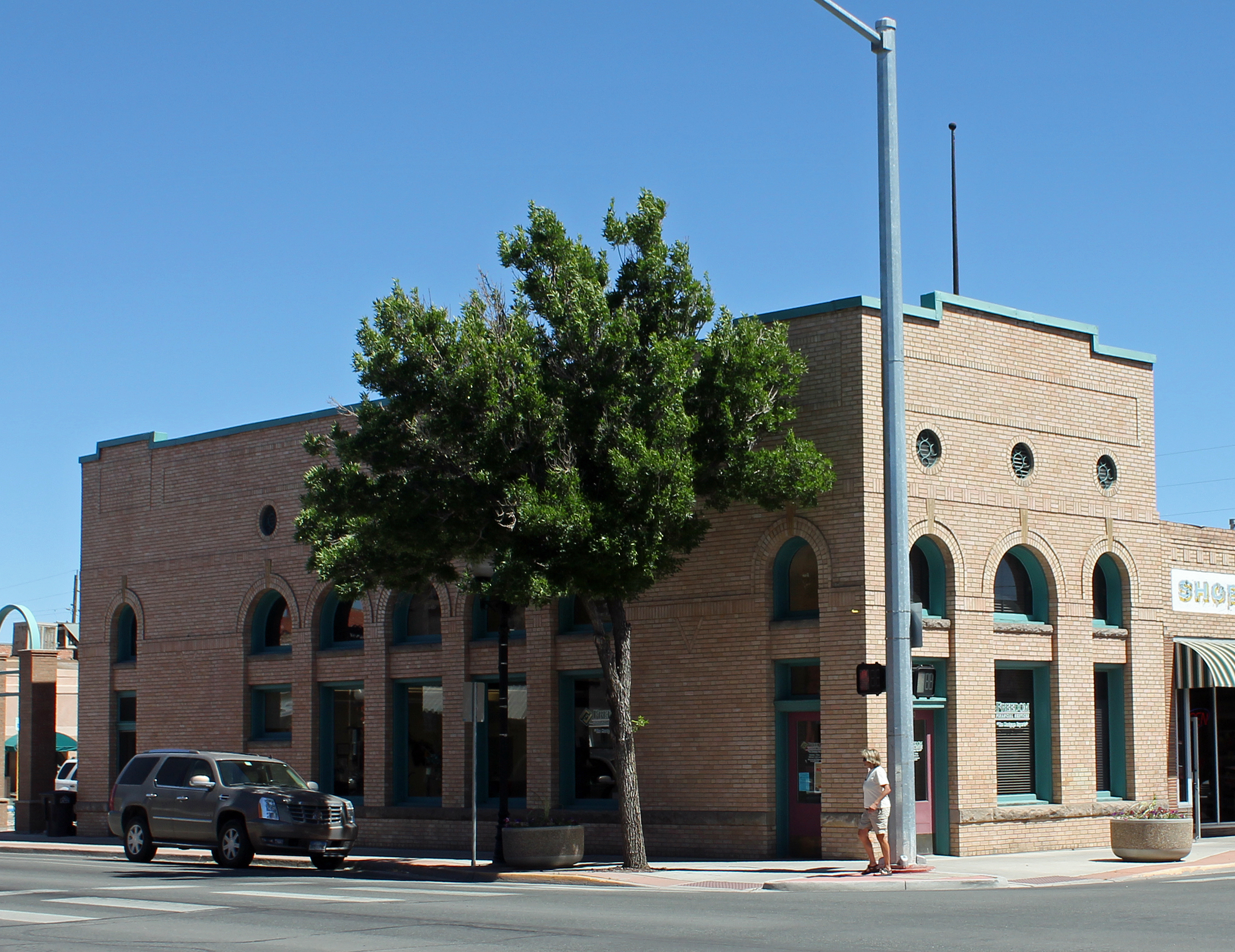
- The building in 2012.

- Location within Colorado Location within the United States
- Location: 500 State Avenue, Alamosa, Colorado
- Coordinates: 37°28′4.84″N 105°51′53.04″W
- Area: less than one acre
- Built: 1909
- Architectural style: Renaissance
- NRHP reference No.: 99000446
- CSRHP No.: 5AL.248
- Added to NRHP: April 15, 1999

The American National Bank Building is a historic bank building located in Alamosa, Colorado. The two-story Arcaded Block-style building was constructed in 1909. The building's most distinctive architectural features are the tall, evenly spaced, rounded arches on the north and west sides of the building. The bank closed in 1951. It was occupied by a floral shop beginning in 1979. It was added to the National Register of Historic Places on April 15, 1999. It "was intended to show faith in the future of Alamosa" and it represents expansion to the area due to the Homestead Act of 1909.
