= Valley National Bank (disambiguation) =

Valley National Bank or Valley National Bank Building may refer to:

- Valley National Bank of New Jersey, a banking organization founded in 1927
- Valley National Bank of Arizona, a defunct banking organization founded in 1900
  - Valley National Bank (Casa Grande, Arizona), listed on the NRHP in Pinal County, Arizona
  - Valley National Bank Building (Tucson, Arizona), listed on the NRHP in Arizona
- Montezuma Valley National Bank and Store Building, Cortez, CO, listed on the NRHP in Colorado
- Arkansas Valley National Bank, Pawnee, OK, listed on the NRHP in Oklahoma
