= Charles E. Mills =

American businessman and banker (1867–1929)

- Born: March 30, 1867 (Note: One source says 1868, another source says his age at death was 62 which puts the birth year in 1867); Magnolia, Illinois, United States
- Died: January 17, 1929 (aged 61); Phoenix, Arizona, United States
- Education: State University of Iowa; Harvard University
- Occupation: Businessman / Banker
- Known for: President Apache Powder Company; President Valley Bank of Arizona

Charles E. Mills (March 30, 1867 – January 17, 1929) was an American businessman and banker. Born in Illinois and raised in Iowa, Mills went to the Arizona Territory and applied his engineering education in the mining industry. Except for a return east for two years while studying at Harvard University, and time in the military during the Spanish–American War and World War I, he remained in Arizona where he managed several mining operations. He also entered the banking industry in the territory, and ended his career as president of two prominent Arizona corporations, the Apache Powder Company and the Valley Bank of Arizona.

== Early life and education ==
Mills was born in Magnolia, Illinois in 1867 or 1868 and brought to Cedar Rapids, Iowa by his parents shortly afterwards. He grew up there, graduating from Cedar Rapids High School and the State University of Iowa School of Engineering. After graduation, he then moved to the Arizona Territory in 1888 and was employed in Bisbee at the Copper Queen Mine. After a short time, he continued his education at Harvard University where he spent two years studying mining and engineering.

== Mining industry ==
Mills returned to Arizona and joined the Detroit Copper Mining Company at Morenci as its general manager. At the outbreak of the Spanish American War, he resigned from the company to join Teddy Roosevelt's Rough Riders as a private. After the war, he returned to Morenci and resumed his position there. He left that job in 1912 to become general manager of two companies, both located in Miami (Arizona). As general manager of the Inspiration Consolidated Copper Company, he oversaw construction of the ore processing mill, buildings, and implementation of the flotation concentration process. At the same time, he was responsible for the construction of the smelter at the International Smelting Company.

When the United States entered World War I, Mills volunteered to work at the US Army Aircraft Department. This was a job for which he was not paid, called a "dollar-a-year man". After the war, he returned to the mining industry in Arizona where he turned his efforts to providing lower cost explosives for the region's mines, which had to be purchased from other states. He organized the Apache Powder Company in rural Cochise County as a cooperative venture of the large mines in the state. The company would produce explosives locally to reduce the large freight charges being incurred. Mills was a shareholder and president of the company until his death. It became the largest explosives manufacturer in the southwestern United States and the largest explosive manufacturing plant in the country.

Mills was also a partner of some mining claims in the Grand Canyon area with a friend from the Rough Riders.

== Banking industry ==
In parallel with mining, Mills became a banker in 1899. He organized the Gila Valley Bank in Solomonville, in Graham County which became the largest branch banking operation in the territory. He became the bank's majority shareholder and president by 1908. In 1914, another large Arizona bank, The Valley Bank, based in Phoenix, was near insolvency and turned to the Gila Valley Bank for assistance. Mills engineered a bailout, and the two formally merged in 1922 forming the Valley Bank of Arizona, which Mills led as president until his death. The bank continued to prosper as a large Arizona bank until it was absorbed by Bank One in 1992.

== Death ==
Mills died January 17, 1929, at St. Joseph's Hospital in Phoenix and was buried in Forest Lawn Cemetery, in Los Angeles, California.
