= Hungry Hands =

Studio album by American Standards
- Released: May 30, 2014
- Studio: The Residency, Van Nuys, CA
- Genre: Metalcore, hardcore punk, post-hardcore, mathcore
- Length: 9:50
- Label: Enjoyment Records, Nacion Libre, Torn Flesh Records
- Producer: American Standards

American Standards chronology
The Death of Rhythm and Blues (2013)	Hungry Hands (2014)	Anti-Melody (2017)

Hungry Hands is the third studio album by American metalcore band American Standards, released on May 30, 2014.

== Release ==
"Casket Party" was the first single released with an accompanying music video on May 23, 2014.

KeepItFast.com wrote of Hungry Hands "What sets Arizona’s American Standards apart from their hardcore contemporaries is their inventiveness and balls to mix things up rather than sticking to a familiar path. At only three tracks long, Hungry Hands is a brief but chaotic bruising of blunt, passionate hardcore."

== Track listing ==
All tracks are written by American Standards.

No.	Title	Length
1.	"Casket Party"	3:05
2.	"Circus Rats"	3.06
3.	"The Complex Death Machine"	3:39
Total length:		9:50

== Personnel ==
Writing, performance and production credits are adapted from the album liner notes.

=== American Standards ===
- Brandon Kellum – vocals
- Corey Skowronski – guitar
- Steven Mandell – bass
- Mike Cook – drums

=== Production ===
- American Standards – production, mixing
- Andy Marshall – engineering
- Brad Boatright – mastering at Audiosiege, Portland, OR

=== Design ===
- Corey Skowronski – art, design
