= Anti-Melody =

Studio album by American Standards
- Released: April 28, 2017
- Studio: Kingsize Soundlabs, Los Angeles, CA
- Genre: Metalcore, hardcore punk, post-hardcore, mathcore
- Length: 24:35
- Label: Independent
- Producer: American Standards

American Standards chronology
Hungry Hands (2014)	Anti-Melody (2017)

Anti-Melody is the fourth studio album by American metalcore band American Standards, released on April 28, 2017.

== Release ==
Anti-Melody features 8 new tracks recorded at Kingsize Soundlabs in Los Angeles which is known for recording bands such as Bad Religion, The Mars Volta and Letlive. It was mastered by Jason Maas of Defeater and mixed by the band. The first single "Writer's Block Party" was premiered exclusively through Lambgoat on March 17, 2017 when the album was announced for release on April 28, 2017. The album's second single "Carpe Diem, Tomorrow" was premiered April 17, 2017 through Revolver Magazine and was also featured on Alternative Press.

Vocalist Brandon Kellum said of Anti-Melody: "What started as social commentary on the growing divide in our society became very personal when our founding guitarist (Cody Conrad) passed of suicide and then soon after, my father of cancer. We went back in to re-write much of the album and in many ways used it as therapy to cope with the experiences. Although intimate, at its core Anti-Melody is centered around the universal theme of separation on many levels."

== Track listing ==
All tracks are written by American Standards.

No.	Title	Length
1.	"Writers Block Party"	2:31
2.	"Carpe Diem, Tomorrow"	2:29
3.	"Churchburner"	2:34
4.	"Bartenders Without Wings"	4:15
5.	"Danger Music No. 9"	2:08
6.	"Cancer Eater"	2:31
7.	"Broken Culture"	1:57
8.	"Chicago Overcoat"	5:56
Total length:		24:35

== Personnel ==
Writing, performance and production credits are adapted from the album liner notes.

=== American Standards ===
- Brandon Kellum – vocals
- Corey Skowronski – guitar
- Steven Mandell – bass
- Mitch Hosier – drums

=== Production ===
- American Standards – production, mixing
- Andy Marshall – engineering
- Theo Keron – engineering assistant
- Jay Maas – mastering at Gateway Recordings, Boston, MA

=== Design ===
- Corey Skowronski – art, design
