= Professional Building (Phoenix, Arizona) =

Historic building in Phoenix

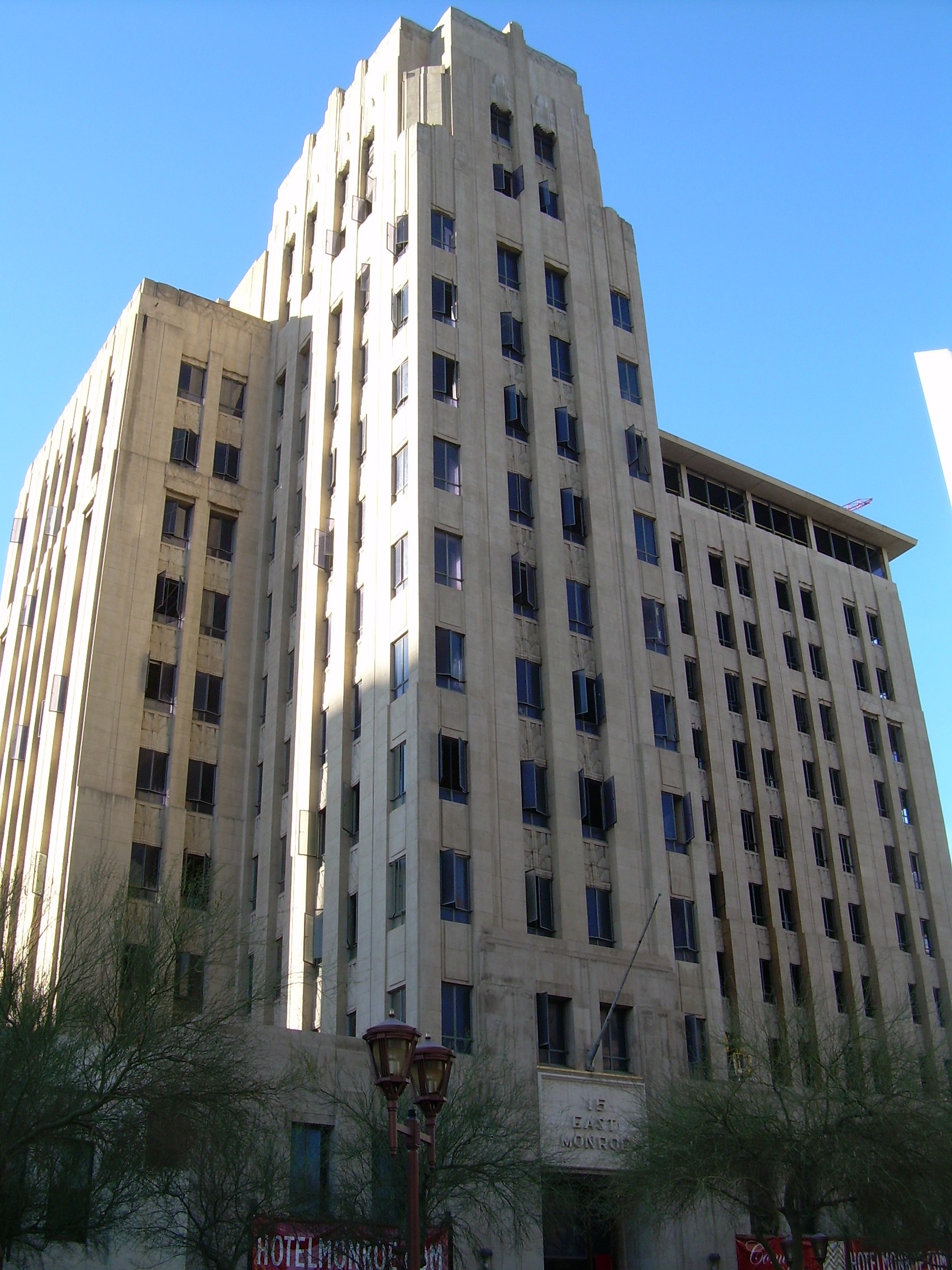
- Interactive map of the Professional Building area

General information
- Location: 15 E. Monroe St. Central Avenue and Monroe Street; Phoenix, Arizona
- Coordinates: 33.4501°N 112.0735°W
- Construction started: 1931
- Completed: 1932

Height
- Roof: 171 ft (52 m)
- Top floor: 12

Technical details
- Floor count: 12

Design and construction
- Architect: Morgan, Walls & Clements
- Main contractor: L. E. Dixon Construction Co.
- Professional Building
- U.S. National Register of Historic Places
- Architect: Morgan, Walls & Clements
- Architectural style: Art Deco
- MPS: Phoenix Commercial MRA (AD)
- NRHP reference No.: 85003563
- Added to NRHP: January 8, 1993

The Professional Building in Phoenix, Arizona is an Art Deco skyscraper. Built in 1932, it is 171 feet (52 m) tall. Angles and setbacks are played up in this streamlined Art Deco design. A central tower rises from the two-story base with a wing on the western side of the building. The entrances on Central Avenue and Monroe Street feature decorative grills above the doors.

It functioned as an office building from 1932 until losing its last tenants in the 1990s. The building subsequently sat empty for two decades, before reopening as a hotel in 2015.

== History ==
In 1930, members of the Maricopa County Medical Society met to discuss the need for a major facility for medical, dental and laboratory offices. Coincidentally, the Valley Bank and Trust Company (later to be known as Valley National Bank of Arizona) was preparing plans to build their headquarters. The Professional Building is the result of combining the office space needs of both entities.

Upon completion in February 1932, the Valley Bank moved into the bottom three floors with medical offices occupying the top seven.

In 1958, a large rotating Valley National Bank sign was added to the top of the tower. It measured 49 feet (15 m) across and could be seen from miles around. Also in 1958 another floor was added to the western wing. This floor differs slightly from the rest of the building, as it is mostly glass and it is attached to the central core tower by a 45 degree angled cantilever. (In the opening shot of Alfred Hitchcock's 1960 film Psycho, the building along with the rotating sign can be seen as the camera pans across the then-skyline of downtown Phoenix.)

In 1972, the Valley Bank moved across the street to the tallest skyscraper in the state, its newly built headquarters, now known as Chase Tower.

In the next two decades, the building's occupancy dwindled, yet on January 8, 1993, the Professional Building was listed on the National Register of Historic Places.

By the early 2000s, the building had been vacant for years and the revolving sign had been removed.

Scottsdale-based Grace Communities purchased the Professional Building in 2005, intending to renovate it and convert it to a boutique hotel named Hotel Monroe. Preliminary construction work was started during 2007, with most of the interior of the building gutted. Originally slated to open in October 2008, the Hotel Monroe project was cancelled due to the collapse of its lender, Mortgages Ltd.

In 2013, the building was the last of the Mortgages Ltd. properties to be sold off, going to CSM Lodging for $7.9 million. The building was renovated from 2014 to 2015, with assistance from the Phoenix Community Development & Investment Corporation and the New Markets Tax Credit Program, and opened in December 2015 as a Hilton Garden Inn. The renovation of the building as a 170-room hotel was finished in 2016 and concluded with a formal opening ceremony on May 19, 2016.
