= Still Life (American Standards album) =

Studio album by American Standards
- Released: June 30, 2012
- Studio: JM Studios in Gilbert, Arizona
- Genres: Metalcore; hardcore punk; post-hardcore; mathcore
- Length: 17:26
- Labels: Victory Records, We Are Triumphant
- Producer: American Standards

American Standards chronology
Still Life (2012)	The Death Of Rhythm And Blues (2013)

Still Life is the first studio album by American metalcore band American Standards, released on June 30, 2012.

== Release ==
"Harvester" was the first single from Still Life with an accompanying music video released on June 30, 2012. The second single and video "The Still Life" was released August 19, 2012.

== Track listing ==
All tracks are written by American Standards.

No.	Title	Length
1.	"Self (en)Titled"	1:04
2.	"Raised by Wolves"	1:44
3.	"Bottom Feeder"	1:58
4.	"Paradigm Alt+Shift+Delete"	2:39
5.	"Harvester"	3:08
6.	"The Red Queen"	2:44
7.	"The Still Life"	4:12
Total length:		17:26

== Personnel ==
Writing, performance and production credits are adapted from the album liner notes.

=== American Standards ===
- Brandon Kellum – vocals
- Brennen Westermeyer – guitar
- Cody Conrad – guitar
- Corey Skowronski – bass
- Geoff Gittleson – drums

=== Production ===
- Joe Gerhard – production, mixing
- Michael Gessert – engineering,
- Jay Maas – mastering at Getaway Recordings in Boston

=== Design ===
- Corey Skowronski – art, design
