= Trevor G. Browne High School =

Location
- 7402 West Catalina Drive; Phoenix, Arizona 85033; United States; 33°29′01″N 112°13′08″W

Information
- Other name: Trevor Browne High School
- Type: Public secondary school
- Motto: Once a bruin, always a bruin.
- Established: 1972; 54 years ago
- School district: Phoenix Union High School District
- NCES District ID: 0406330
- NCES School ID: 040633000554
- Principal: Stephanie Streeter
- Teaching staff: 140.00 (FTE)
- Grades: 9–12
- Enrollment: 2,803 (2023–2024)
- Student to teacher ratio: 20.02
- Colors: Brown and orange
- Mascot: Bruin
- Rival: Maryvale High School
- Newspaper: "The Orange Juice News"
- Website: www.pxu.org/o/tbhs

Trevor G. Browne High School (also known as Trevor Browne High School) is part of the Phoenix Union High School District in Phoenix, Arizona.

== History ==
The plans for the school were approved by the school board in April 1970. Guirey, Srnka, Arnold & Sprinkle were the architects of the school. The campus featured a revolutionary design with movable walls and multi use spaces. M. M. Sundt Construction Company was the general contractor who built the school. The school began to accept students in the fall of 1972, and was named after Trevor Goff Browne, a Canadian-born man who taught at Harvard Medical School. Browne, who died in 1977, donated the land on which Trevor Browne High School was built.

== Partner elementary district ==
- Cartwright

== Notable alumni ==
- Steve Gallardo – member of the Arizona State Senate
- Marcel Jones – New Orleans Saints (2012–)
- Brandon Kellum – vocalist of the band American Standards
- John Patterson – San Francisco Giants, 1992–95
- CeCe Peniston – singer and beauty queen
