= The Death of Rhythm and Blues =

EP by American Standards
- Released: September 12, 2013
- Studio: JM Studios, Gilbert, AZ
- Genre: Metalcore, hardcore punk, post-hardcore, mathcore
- Length: 13:50
- Label: Independent
- Producer: American Standards

American Standards chronology
Still Live (2012)	The Death of Rhythm and Blues (2013)	Hungry Hands (2014)

The Death of Rhythm and Blues is an EP by American metalcore band American Standards, released on September 12, 2013.

== Release ==
"The Engine and the Engineer" was the first single released with an accompanying music video on September 6, 2013.

== Track listing ==
All tracks are written by American Standards

No.	Title	Length
1.	"The Engine and the Engineer"	3:08
2.	"Dead Man's Victory"	2:37
3.	"The Burden of Being"	2:41
4.	"Interlude"	1:37
5.	"Misery Relapse"	3:47
Total length:		13:50

== Personnel ==
Writing, performance and production credits are adapted from the album liner notes.

=== American Standards ===
- Brandon Kellum – vocals
- Brennen Westermeyer – guitar
- Corey Skowronski – bass
- Geoff Gittleson – drums

=== Production ===
- Joe Gerhard – production, mixing
- Michael Gessert – engineering
- Jay Maas – mastering at Getaway Recordings, Boston, MA

=== Design ===
- Corey Skowronski – art, design
