= Fred M. Guirey =

American architect (1908–1984)

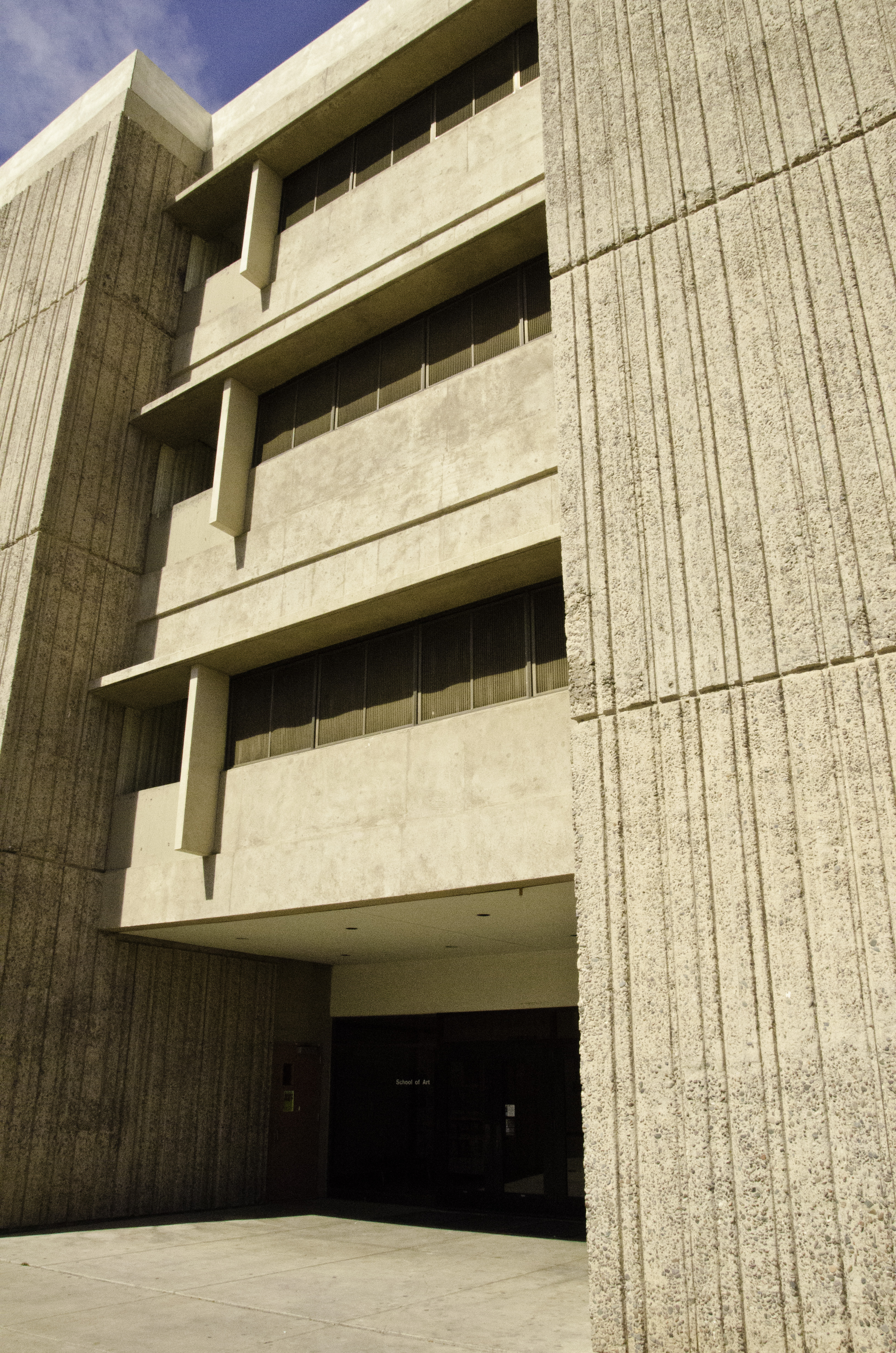
- Art and Architecture Complex, Arizona State University
- Born: December 6, 1908; Oakland, California
- Died: 1984 (aged 75–76); Phoenix, Arizona
- Education: UC Berkeley
- Occupation: Architect
- Spouse: Catherine Bolen (m. 1939)
- Practice: Guirey & Quist, Guirey & Jones, Guirey, Srnka & Arnold, Guirey, Srnka, Arnold & Sprinkle (GSAS)

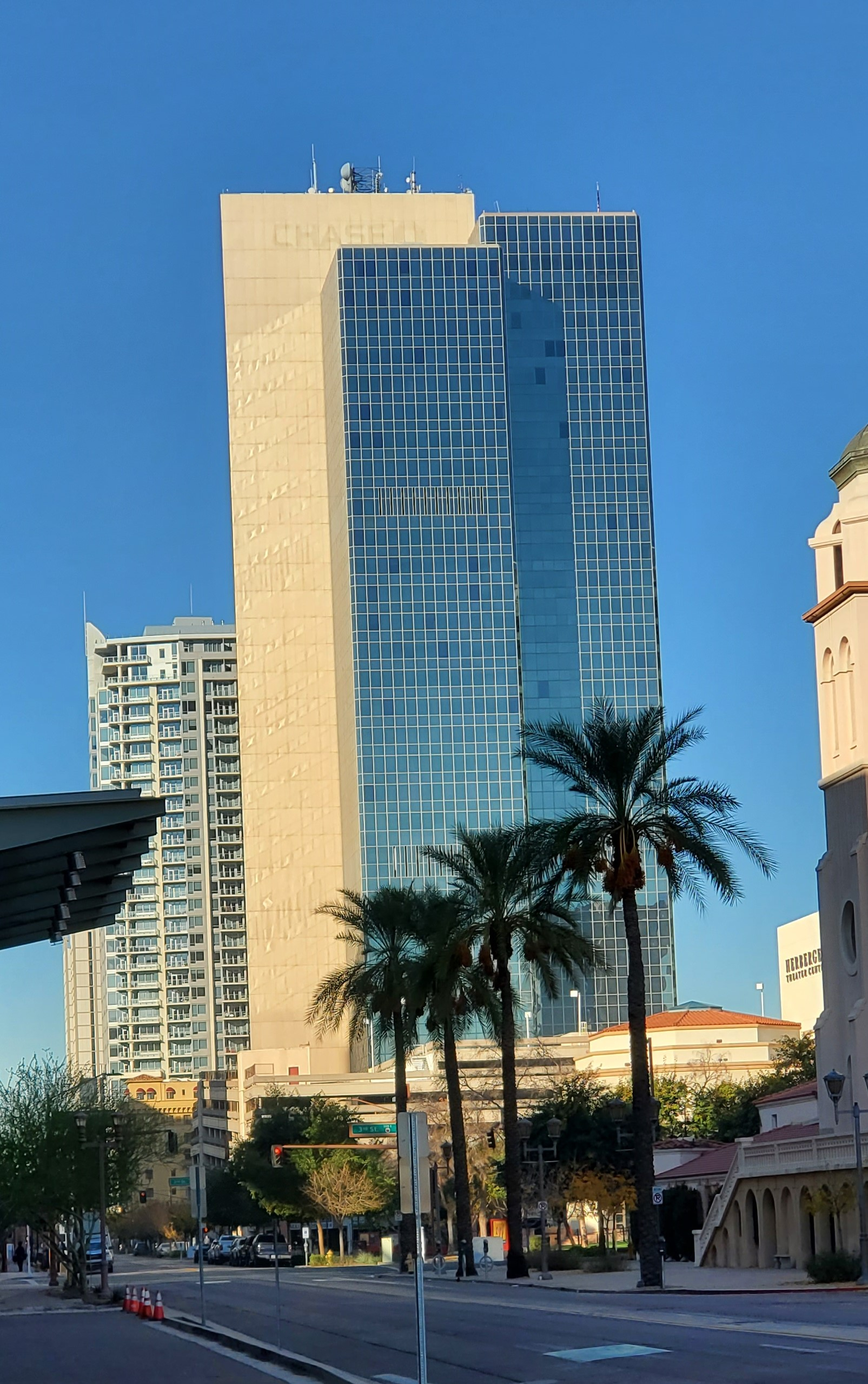
Guirey served as local associate to Welton Becket for the Chase Tower in Phoenix

Fred Melville Guirey (1908-1984) was an architect working in Phoenix, Arizona, United States, from the 1930s to the 1980s. Over his career his firm produced many works some of which are considered exceptional examples of Mid-Century Modern, and Brutalist architecture.

== Life ==
He was born on December 6, 1908, in Oakland, California, he graduated University of California, Berkeley with a degree in architecture in 1933. After his graduation he worked for the Arizona highway department as a landscape architect. In 1939 he married Catherine Bolen. that same year they began building their home in Phoenix. In 1946 he began his profession as a Phoenix architect with a partnership with Stan Quist as the firm Guirey & Quist. Stan Quist died in 1947 and Guirey subsequently entered a partnership with Hugh Jones as the firm Guirey & Jones. The two were associated until 1950 at which time Guirey began to practice on his own. In 1952 he built his architecture office at 506 East Camelback in Phoenix. In 1961 he entered partnership with Milan E. Srnka and Richard M. Arnold and his firm became known as Guirey, Srnka & Arnold. In 1965 they hired George Sprinkle to manage the firm's satellite Flagstaff office. Around 1970 George Sprinkle was made a partner and the firm became known as Guirey, Srnka, Arnold & Sprinkle or GSAS Architects for short. In the early 1980s Guirey had two heart attacks which restricted his work. In 1980 George Sprinkle died of a brain tumor. In 1982 Richard Arnold died; that same year, there was a fire at the office. The firm was merged with Daniel, Mann, Johnson & Mendenhall in 1982. Fred Guirey died in 1984.

== Selected works ==
Guirey's works include

- 1939 Guirey House, Phoenix, Arizona
- 1946 Mocine House, Phoenix, Arizona
- 1949 Phoenix Union High School Home Economics Building, Phoenix, Arizona(Demolished)
- 1950 Harmon Library, Phoenix, Arizona(Demolished)
- 1951 McClintock Hall, Arizona State University, Tempe, Arizona
- 1952 Guirey Office (506 East Camelback) Phoenix, Arizona
- 1954 Camelback High School, Phoenix, Arizona (Demolished)
- 1954 Greenwood Garden Mausoleum, Phoenix, Arizona
- 1956 Arizona Highway Department Building, Phoenix, Arizona (with J Harold MacDowell)
- 1956 Cotton King Research Plant, Phoenix, Arizona
- 1958 Messinger Mortuary & Chapel, Scottsdale, Arizona
- 1960 Hibiscus Apartments, Phoenix, Arizona
- 1960 444 West Camelback, Phoenix, Arizona
- 1960 Superlite Block Building (now Humanities & Sciences Institute) Phoenix, ArizonaAZ
- 1961 400 West Camelback, Phoenix, Arizona
- 1961 Arizona Public Service Headquarters, Phoenix, Arizona
- 1962 Coronet Apartment, Phoenix, Arizona(Significantly Altered)
- 1962 Mohave General Hospital, Kingman, Arizona
- 1963 Cowden Hall, Northern Arizona University, Flagstaff, Arizona
- 1963 Tinsley Hall, Northern Arizona University, Flagstaff, Arizona
- 1964 Phoenix Municipal Stadium, Phoenix, Arizona
- 1965 North Congressional Church (now Church of the Beatitudes) Phoenix, Arizona
- 1966 Lowell Observatory, Center for Planetary Research Flagstaff, Arizona
- 1967 Coconino High School, Flagstaff, Arizona
- 1967 Sechrist Hall, Northern Arizona University, Flagstaff, Arizona
- 1968 Valley National Bank Holbrook branch, Holbrook, Arizona
- 1968 Thunderbird School of Global Management, Phoenix, Arizona (site plan)
- 1968 Allen Hall, Northern Arizona, University, Flagstaff, Arizona
- 1968 Reilly Hall, Northern Arizona University, Flagstaff, Arizona
- 1968-1970 Arts and Architecture Complex, Arizona State University, Tempe, Arizona
- 1969 McConnell Hall, Northern Arizona University, Flagstaff, Arizona
- 1970 Western Savings Sun City branch, Sun City, Arizona
- 1972 Trevor G. Browne High School, Phoenix, Arizona
- 1972 Valley Center, now Chase Tower, Phoenix, Arizona (local associate to Welton Becket)
- 1972 Raul H. Castro Social and Behavioral Sciences Building, Northern Arizona University, Flagstaff, Arizona
- 1973 New Resurrection Mausoleum, Phoenix, Arizona
- 1974 Shadow Mountain High School, Phoenix, Arizona
- 1974 Packard Stadium, Arizona State University, Tempe, Arizona
- 1975 Durango Juvenile Detention Facility, Phoenix, Arizona
- 1977 Scottsdale Community College Performing Arts Center, Scottsdale, Arizona
- 1978 Biltmore Plaza Shopping Center, Phoenix, Arizona(with Robert Carli)
- 1980 Renovation of Park Central Mall, Phoenix, Arizona
- 1981 Westcor Corporate Office Complex, 11411 N Tatum Blvd, Phoenix, Arizona
- 1982 Arizona Republic Southeast Production Facility, Mesa, Arizona (Demolished)
- 1982-1984 Business Administration C-Building, Arizona State University, Tempe, Arizona
