= Wingspan (disambiguation) =

A wingspan is the distance between the wingtips of a flying animal or aircraft.

Wingspan may also refer to:

== Music ==
- Wingspan (Mulgrew Miller album), 1987
- Wingspan: Hits and History, a 2001 Paul McCartney compilation

== Periodicals ==
- Wingspan (magazine), of Birds Australia
- Wingspan, All Nippon Airways' in-flight magazine

== Other media ==
- Wingspan (board game), a 2019 card-driven bird-themed game
- Wingspan (film), a 2001 television documentary about Paul McCartney's career
- Wingspan (Transformers), a character from The Transformers television series
- Wing Span is a minor character of Chuck Chicken

== Other uses ==
- Wingspan, another term for arm span
- Wingspan Bank, a defunct American Internet bank
- Wingspan National Bird of Prey Centre, a New Zealand falconry attraction on Mount Ngongotaha
