= Chase Tower (Phoenix) =

Tallest building in Arizona, U.S.

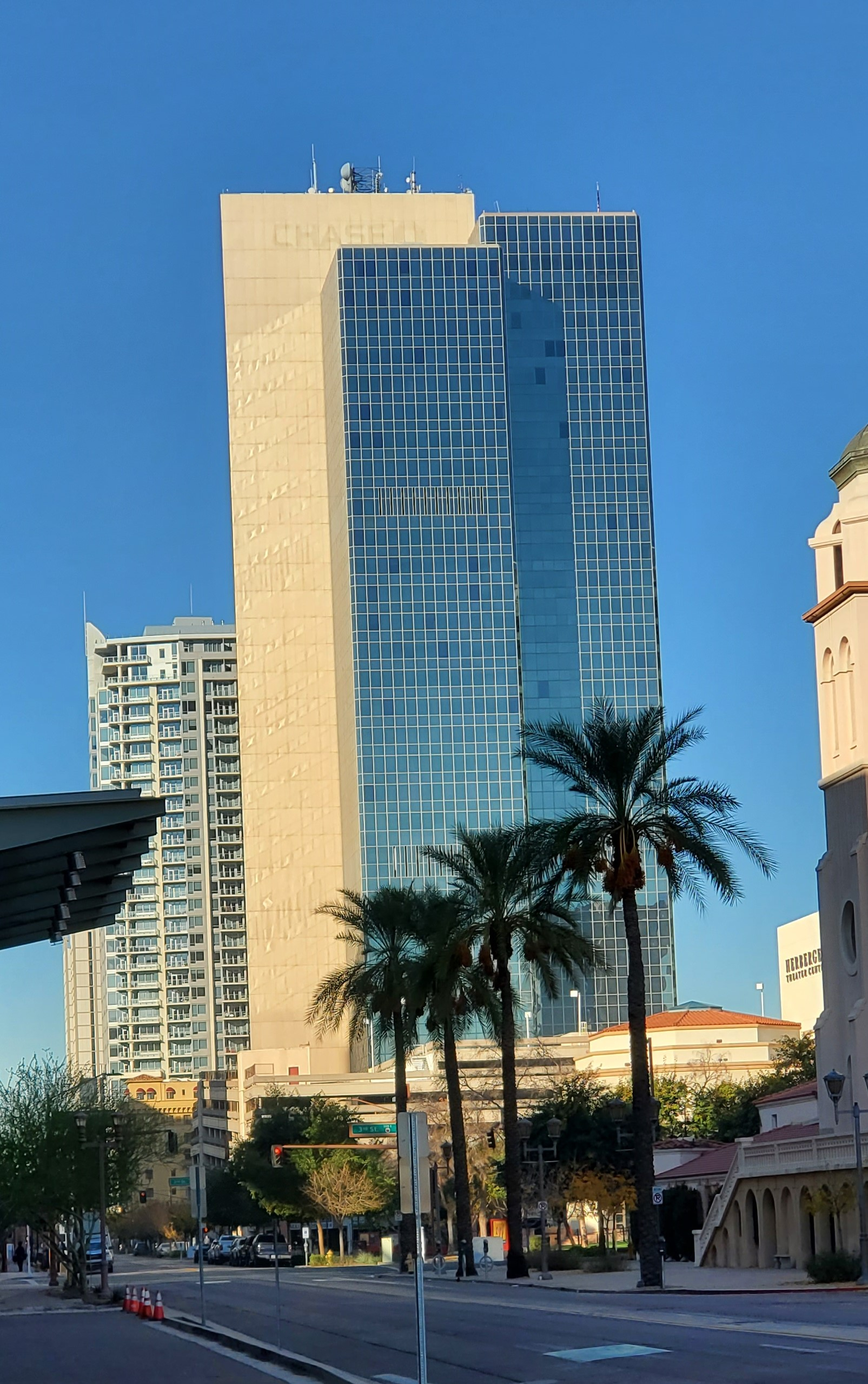
- Chase Tower in 2022
- Former names: Valley Center, Bank One Center

General information
- Location: Phoenix, Arizona
- Coordinates: 33.4509°N 112.0731°W
- Groundbreaking: December 1970
- Completed: 1972
- Opening: June 1973
- Cost: $41 Million (USD)

Height
- Roof: 483 ft (147 m)

Technical details
- Floor count: 40
- Floor area: 668,159 sq ft (62,074.0 m^{2})

Design and construction
- Architects: Welton Becket and Associates; Guirey, Srnka, Arnold, & Sprinkle
- Developer: Valley National Bank of Arizona
- Main contractor: Henry C. Beck Company, Kitchell Contractors, Inc.

Chase Tower (formerly known as Valley Bank Center and Bank One Center) is a 40-story skyscraper at 201 North Central Avenue in Phoenix, Arizona. Opened in 1972, the building was designed by architects Welton Becket and Fred M. Guirey. The skyscraper is located in Central Avenue Corridor, an economic and residential region of Downtown Phoenix.

Chase Tower was initially constructed in 1972 for Valley National Bank. Bank One merged with Valley National Bank in 1992. and Chase merged with Bank One in 2005. The building was renamed in December 2005.

At 483 ft (147 m), Chase Tower is the tallest building in Arizona.

== Site ==
Chase Tower is on 201 North Central Avenue, in the Central Avenue Corridor region of Downtown Phoenix.

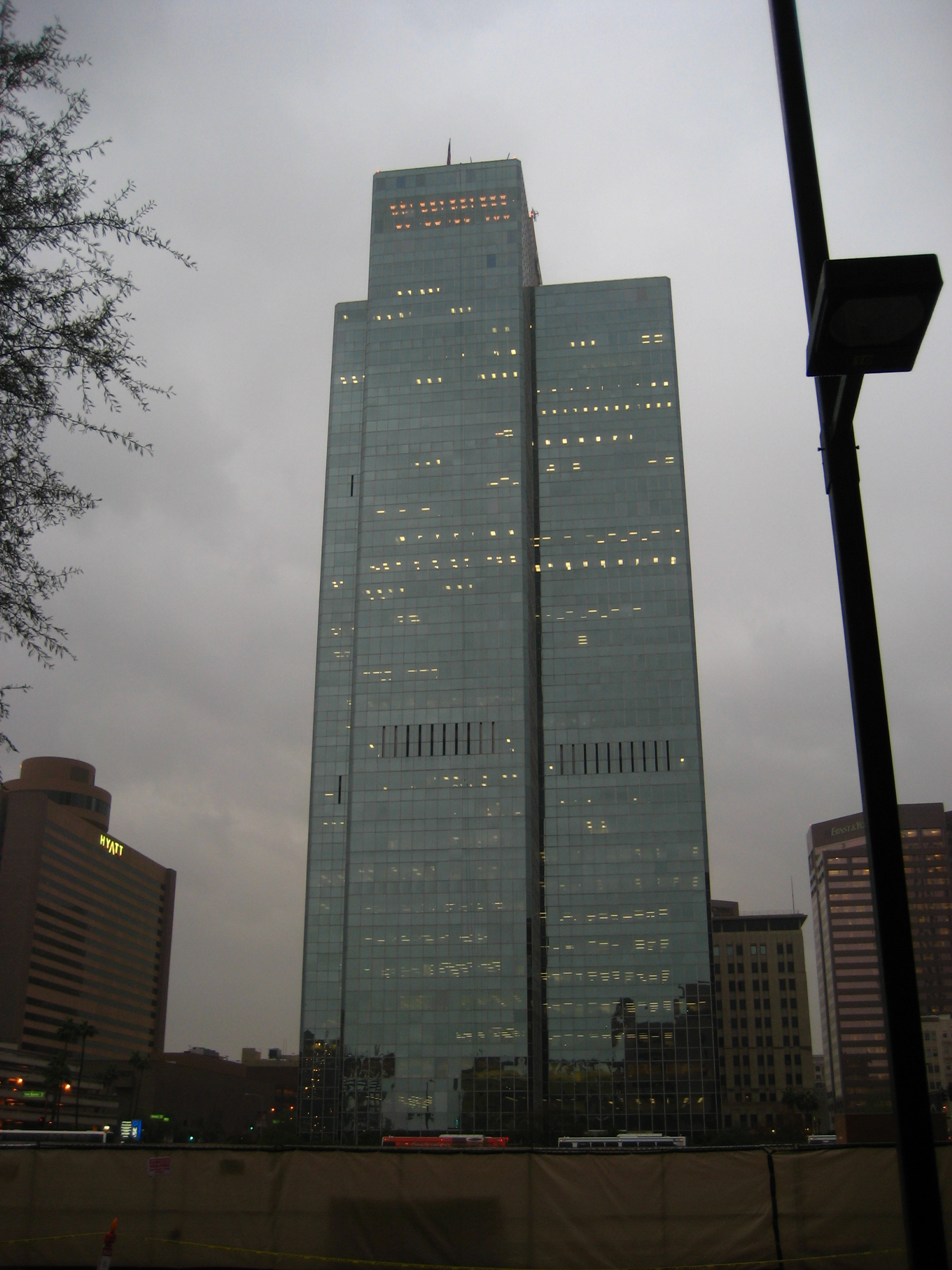
Chase Tower.

Chase Tower is 40 stories tall, but the highest occupiable floor is the 38th. At one time there was a public observation area on the 39th floor in the Chase Tower, but it was closed during redevelopment and construction on the upper floors.

The tower takes up an entire city block. The footprint is similar to a 3 leaf clover and its stem. The stem is the narrow elevator core on the southern facade. It has a rough, concrete texture and is the tallest portion of the tower. The remaining exterior is a glass panel curtain wall. The west leaf, or wing, stands at 34 floors, followed by the north wing at 38 floors, and the east wing at 36 floors. Unlike many traditional skyscrapers with zero-setback retail/lobby space on the ground floor, access to the tower is through an underground restaurant/retail concourse set a comparatively large distance away from the bordering streets.

== History ==
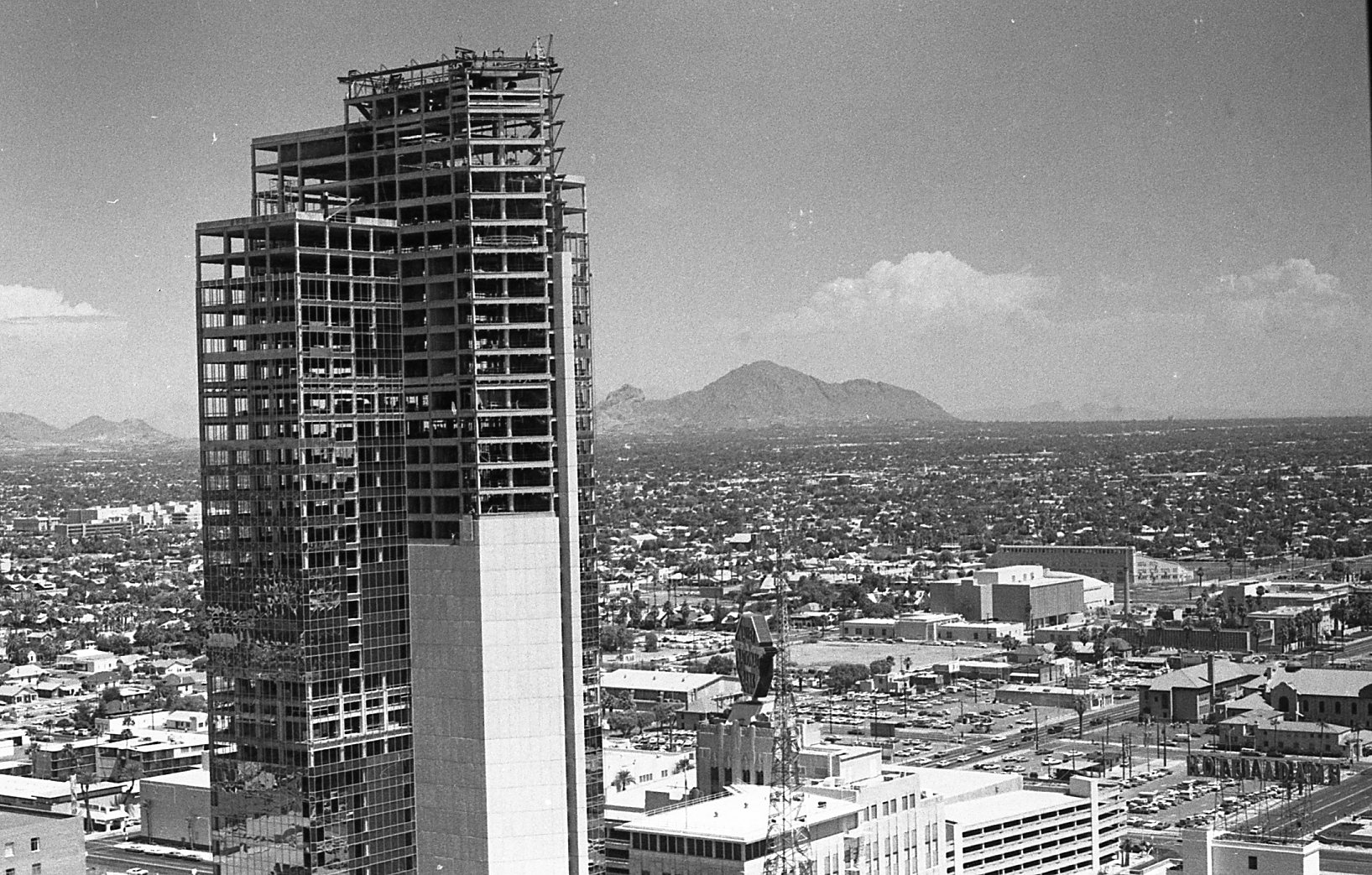
The building under construction in 1972.

The building was designed by the prominent Los Angeles architectural firm Welton Becket and Associates (now Ellerbe Becket), with local associate architects Guirey, Srnka, Arnold & Sprinkle. It was built by the Henry C. Beck Company (now The Beck Group). Kitchell Contractors, Inc. of Phoenix was associate contractor. Site preparations began on December 7, 1970 and ground was broken a few days later. The first structure completed was the parking garage in 1971. The 40 story steel structure was topped out on March 27, 1972. The $41 million building officially opened for business in June 1973.

Upon completion, the tower marked the beginning of a renewed investment in downtown Phoenix that would last for almost twenty years until the savings and loan crisis brought about the 1989 real estate crash. Located at 201 North Central Avenue, the tower was renovated in 2003 to accommodate 800 additional Bank One employees.

In March 2007, CRZ Phoenix, LLC, an affiliate of Crystal River Capital, acquired the property for $166.9 million, the highest price paid for an office building in Phoenix. The owners took out a $198.5 million loan on the property in 2007, on which it subsequently defaulted.

In May 2018, a partnership managed by Wentworth Property Company acquired the building out of foreclosure for $79 million, less than half of its 2007 sale price. Less than six months later, Vincent Viola purchased the building for $107.5 million.

As of July 2021, Chase was in the process of vacating the building as most employees have been transferred to Chase's new corporate campus in (east suburban) Tempe. The last employees were expected to transition to the new location by September 30, 2021. At that point, the building stood empty. No future plans for the tower had been announced. As of November 1, 2021, the Chase sign atop the building has been removed.

On February 7, 2023, an anti-abortion activist named Maison DesChamps, calling himself "Pro-life Spiderman", scaled the tower with no safety gear to raise awareness for a pro-life charity. He successfully reached the roof of the building, and was taken into custody by officers who were waiting at the top, who charged him with trespassing and criminal nuisance.

In March 2025, 12 News reported that the building would receive a remodel that included a hotel and residences as well as office space.

== See also ==
- List of tallest buildings in Phoenix
- List of tallest buildings in Arizona

Preceded by First National Bank Plaza	Tallest Building in Phoenix; 1972—Present; 147m	Succeeded by current
