= Magnolia, Illinois =

Village of Magnolia
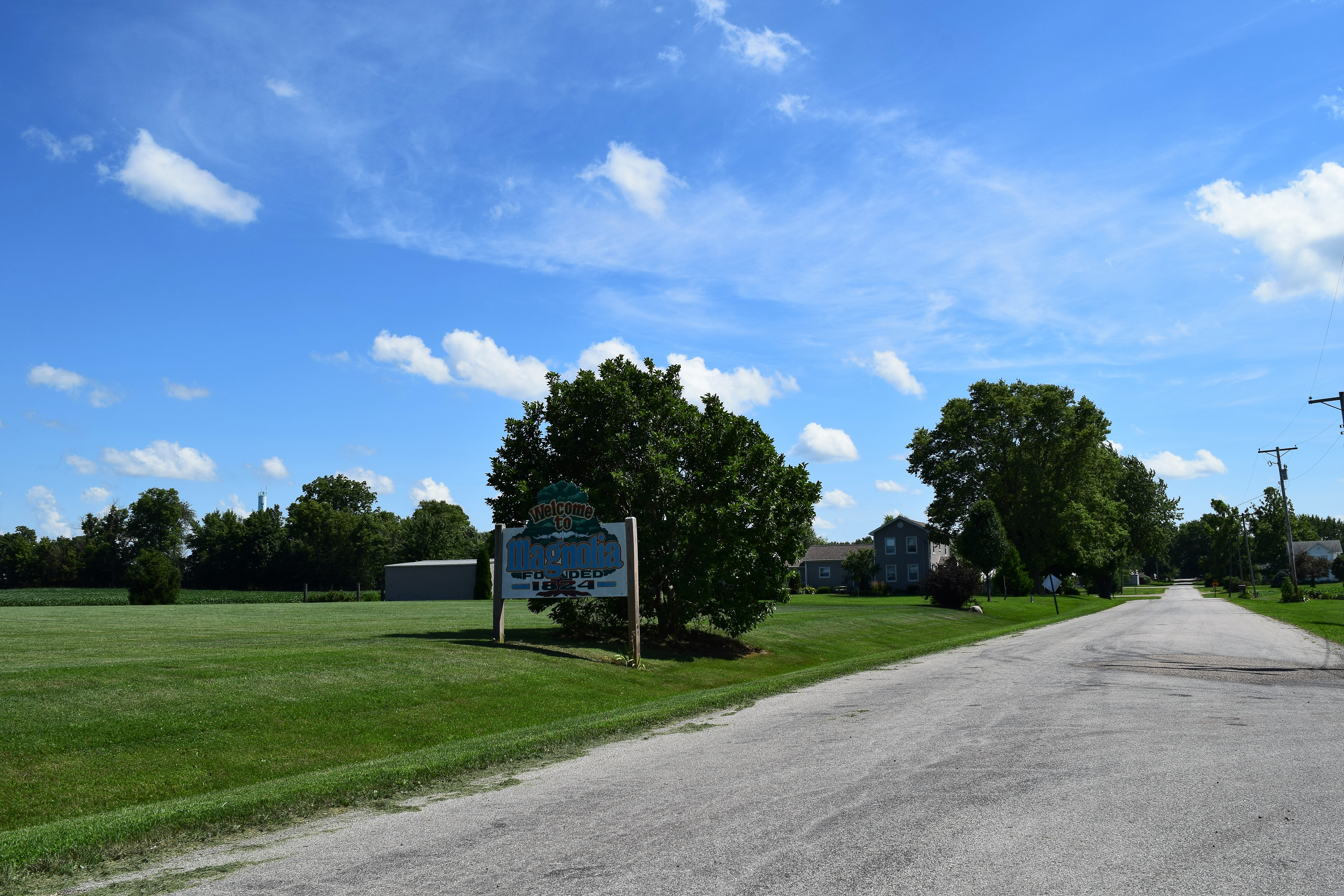
- Welcome sign along the road into Magnolia

- Location of Magnolia in Putnam County, Illinois.
- Coordinates: 41°6′46″N 89°11′43″W
- Country: United States
- State: Illinois
- County: Putnam
- Township: Magnolia

Area
  - Total: 0.31 sq mi (0.81 km^{2})
  - Land: 0.31 sq mi (0.81 km^{2})
  - Water: 0 sq mi (0.00 km^{2})
- Elevation: 666 ft (203 m)

Population (2020)
  - Total: 256
  - Density: 819/sq mi (316.1/km^{2})
- Time zone: UTC-6 (CST)
  - Summer (DST): UTC-5 (CDT)
- ZIP code: 61336
- FIPS code: 17-46110
- GNIS feature ID: 2399225

Magnolia is a village in Putnam County, Illinois, United States. As of the 2020 census, Magnolia had a population of 256. It is part of the Ottawa Micropolitan Statistical Area.

== History ==
Magnolia was settled by William Haws, James W. Willis, and Stephen D. Willis in 1827, and named for the Magnolia tree. Magnolia was the first settled community in Putnam County, and the first county seat.

== Geography ==
According to the 2010 census, the village has a total area of 0.33 square miles (0.85 km^{2}), all land.

== Demographics ==
Historical population
Census	Pop.	Note	%±
1880	305		—
1890	287		−5.9%
1900	264		−8.0%
1910	368		39.4%
1920	321		−12.8%
1930	300		−6.5%
1940	319		6.3%
1950	285		−10.7%
1960	245		−14.0%
1970	328		33.9%
1980	308		−6.1%
1990	261		−15.3%
2000	279		6.9%
2010	260		−6.8%
2020	256		−1.5%
U.S. Decennial Census

As of the census of 2000, there were 279 people, 103 households, and 73 families residing in the village. The population density was 936.9 inhabitants per square mile (361.7/km^{2}). There were 109 housing units at an average density of 366.0 per square mile (141.3/km^{2}). The racial makeup of the village was 95.70% White, 2.51% African American, 1.08% Native American and 0.72% Asian. Hispanic or Latino of any race were 0.36% of the population.

There were 103 households, out of which 33.0% had children under the age of 18 living with them, 57.3% were married couples living together, 6.8% had a female householder with no husband present, and 28.2% were non-families. 22.3% of all households were made up of individuals, and 9.7% had someone living alone who was 65 years of age or older. The average household size was 2.71 and the average family size was 3.20.

In the village, the population was spread out, with 28.7% under the age of 18, 9.3% from 18 to 24, 24.4% from 25 to 44, 22.9% from 45 to 64, and 14.7% who were 65 years of age or older. The median age was 36 years. For every 100 females, there were 87.2 males. For every 100 females age 18 and over, there were 93.2 males.

The median income for a household in the village was $38,125, and the median income for a family was $45,625. Males had a median income of $36,250 versus $25,694 for females. The per capita income for the village was $13,909. About 2.9% of families and 11.1% of the population were below the poverty line, including 11.9% of those under the age of eighteen and 16.3% of those 65 or over.

== Economy ==
Magnolia is a predominantly agricultural community with no industry; the majority of employees work for local farmers, are union contractors, or travel to nearby towns for employment.

== Education ==
It is in the Putnam County Community Unit School District 535.

== Notable people ==
- Mildred Amanda Baker Bonham (1840–1907), traveler, journalist
- Victor Cicero Kays (1882–1966) educator and the founding president of Arkansas State University
- Charles E. Mills (1867–1929), businessman
