= Valley National Bank Building (Tucson, Arizona) =

Skyscraper in Tucson, Arizona

- U.S. National Register of Historic Places
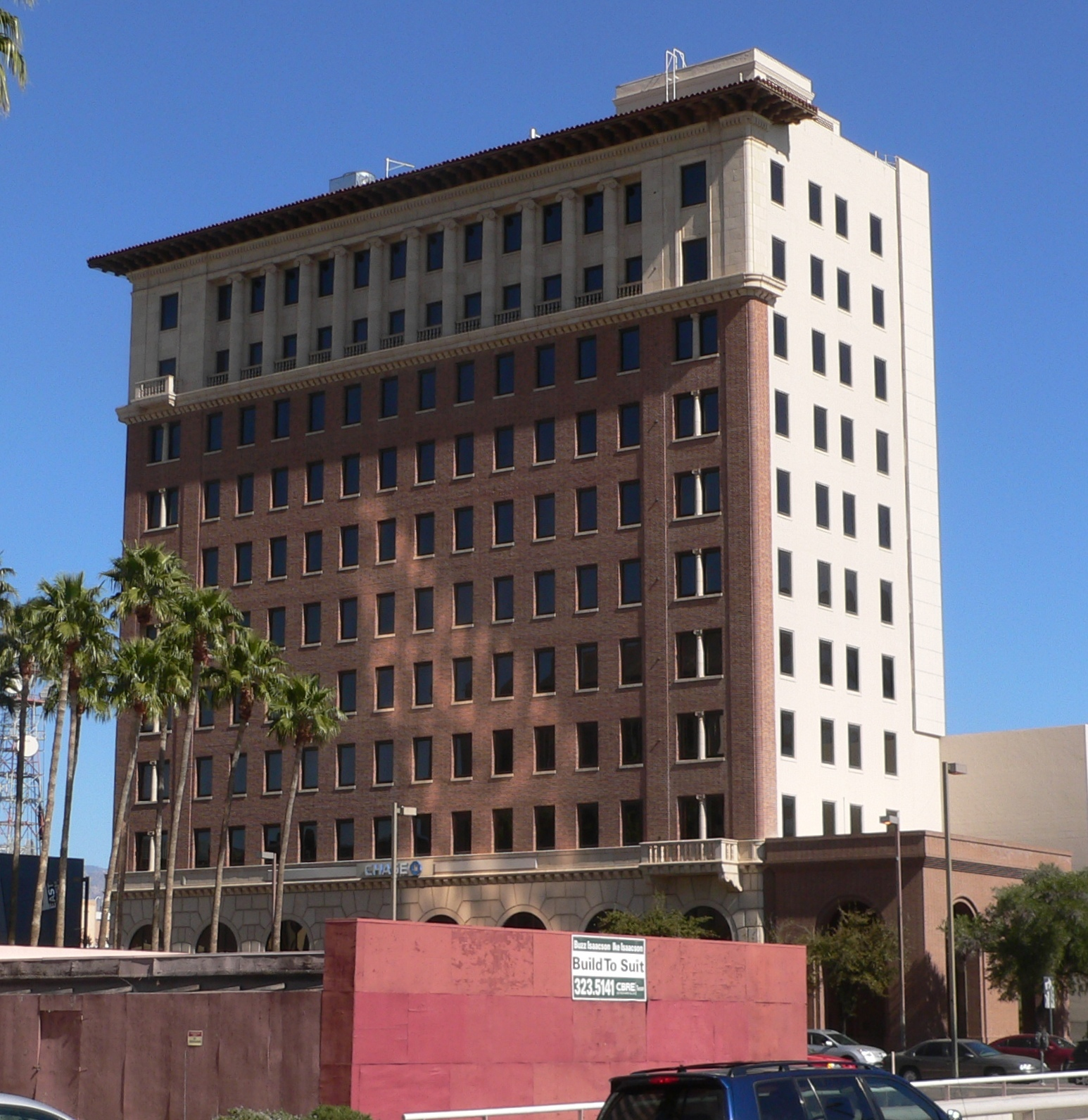
- Valley National Bank Building
- Location: 2 East Congress Street, Tucson, Arizona 85701, US
- Coordinates: 32.22169°N 110.97104°W
- Built: 1929
- Architect: Percy A. Eisen; Albert R. Walker
- NRHP reference No.: 75608928
- Added to NRHP: July 29, 2003

The Valley National Bank Building is the oldest skyscraper in Tucson, Arizona. It was built in 1929 by Percy A. Eisen (1885–1946) and Albert R. Walker (1881–1958). It has housed administrative offices on the second floor. It has been listed on the National Register of Historic Places since September 12, 2003.

== History ==
In March 1901, the Consolidated National Bank of Tucson acquired the bank site and properties adjoining on both sides from General Levi Howard Manning. The pre-existing bank, designed by Henry Trost, was too small, so it was demolished to make way for a new bank. This second bank proved to be too small, and an expansion began in 1917 at the cost of $100,000, in the Corinthian style of architecture common for banks of the era.

In 1928 Consolidated National set out to build Tucson's first skyscraper, which opened in 1929 for the then-staggering cost of $1 million. It opened with 3,000 safety deposit boxes, a testament to the expense of the building and the increasing wealth of Tucsonans. In 1935, Phoenix-based The Valley Bank and Trust bought Consolidated National to form Valley National Bank of Arizona. The Consolidated National Bank Building expresses the taste of the building's patrons and the bank's owners, who were some of Tucson's most prominent businessmen.

The building was the setting for some scenes of the 1956 film A Kiss Before Dying, which was filmed in Tucson.

Bank One acquired Valley National Bank in 1993, and Chase, which bought Bank One in 2004, maintained a bank branch in the structure until it closed on December 6, 2023.

== Architecture ==
The building's facade extends 127 feet along Stone Avenue and 65 feet along Congress Street in downtown Tucson. The building has 10 stories, consisting of a three-part vertical block with basement; the high first story banking offices include a mezzanine and offices above. Fireproof steel frame and poured concrete megaliths form the structure's exterior.

The Valley National Bank Building's design is considered a very late example of influences from the 1893 Columbian Exposition, held in Chicago. This exposition showcased many eclectic revival styles with an eye for historical accuracy, including the Italian Renaissance Revival style of this building. Further adding to this influence are the interior decorations and murals, such as a floral motif in the bank branch which depicted America as the "New Eden", small murals on the ceiling of the lobby depicting manifest destiny painted by Anthony Heinsbergen, a muralist from Los Angeles.

The building is faced with brick and cream terra cotta on its north and west sides. The top tier is capped by a classic cornice and an Italianate hatched overhang painted brown. The roof overhang includes sections featuring a black-and-red geometric motif inspired by Southwest Native American design.

The bank lobby itself includes walls originally painted a grey-green color. The ceiling on the bank level is coffered, with beams carved in a floral motif. A geometric neoclassical motif adorns the ceiling murals and beams, colored in red, rose, green, blue and solid gold leaf.

The mezzanine floor, which has always belonged to the bank, includes three rooms. One was the director's office for T. N. McCauly, with walls of polished Bataan mahogany. Another room was originally designed to cater to women, with wicker furnishings; it still maintains two original crystal chandeliers.

=== Annex ===
One building abuts the Valley National Bank Building. A three-story structure was erected in 1912, which became an annex upon its 1953 renovation and received further changes in 1960. The annex features concrete panels and terrazzo tile.

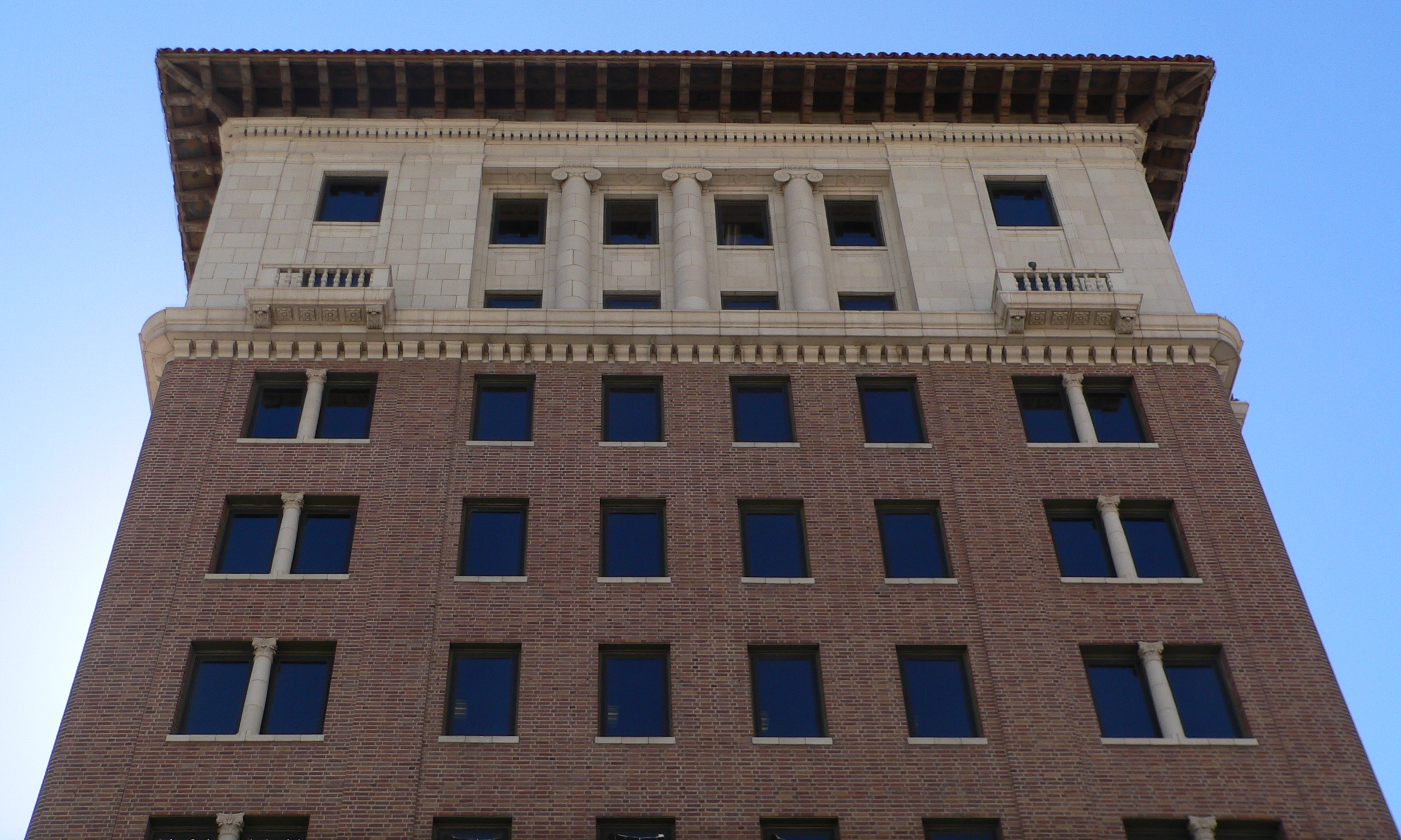
Upper floors.

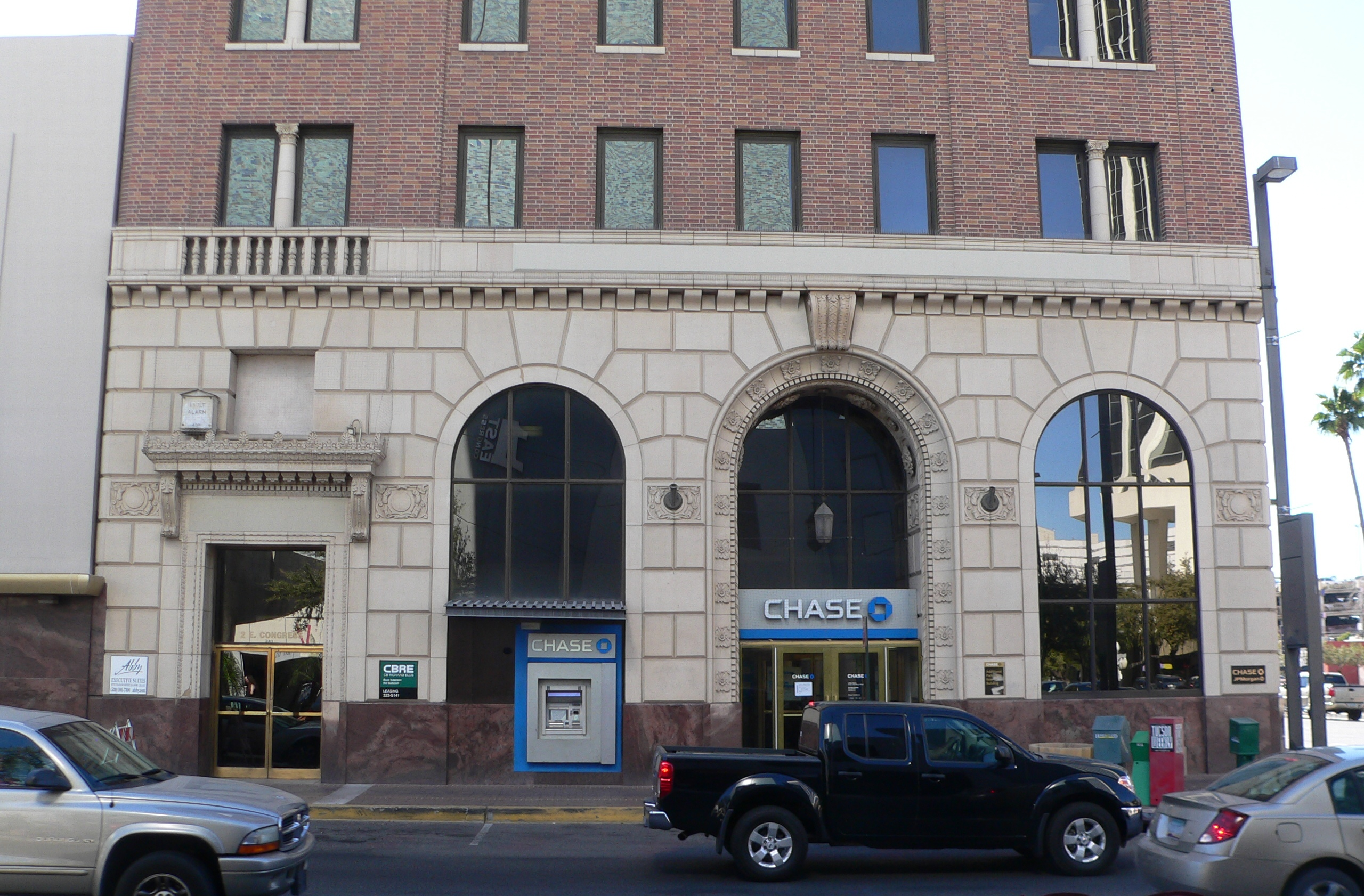
Lower floors.
