= Marcel Jones =

American football player (born 1988)

No. 70, 78
- Position: Offensive tackle

Personal information
- Born: September 4, 1988 (age 38); Phoenix, Arizona, U.S.
- Listed height: 6 ft 6 in (1.98 m)
- Listed weight: 320 lb (145 kg)

Career information
- High school: Phoenix (AZ) Browne
- College: Nebraska
- NFL draft: 2012: 7th round, 234th overall pick

Career history
- New Orleans Saints (2012−2013); Baltimore Ravens (2014−2015)*; San Diego Chargers (2016)*
- * Offseason or practice squad member only
- Stats at Pro Football Reference

Marcel Jones (born September 4, 1988) is an American former football offensive tackle. He was selected in the seventh round, 234th overall, by the Saints in the 2012 NFL draft. He played college football at Nebraska.

== Early life ==
Jones attended Trevor G. Browne High School in Phoenix, Arizona, where he played basketball, track (threw shot put & discus) coached by Head Throws Coach Scott Miller, and was an academic standout. Due to injuries, he played only one year of varsity high school football.

== Professional career ==
=== New Orleans Saints ===
Jones was drafted in the seventh round of the 2012 NFL draft by the New Orleans Saints. On July 2, 2012, he signed a four-year deal with the Saints. On September 8, 2012, Jones was placed on season-ending injured reserve due to a knee injury. Jones spent the 2013 season on the Saints' practice squad. On January 14, 2014, he signed a reserve/future contract with the Saints. On August 30, 2014, he was cut by the Saints.

=== Baltimore Ravens ===
On September 1, 2014, the Baltimore Ravens signed Jones to their practice squad. On January 12, 2015, he signed a reserve/future contract with the Ravens. On August 31, 2015, Jones was cut by the Ravens but was brought back shortly to the practice squad. On November 20, 2015, he was released. On November 27, 2015, he was re-signed to the practice squad. On December 4, 2015, the Baltimore Ravens released Jones from the practice squad. On December 15, 2015, he was re-signed to the practice squad.

=== San Diego Chargers ===
Jones was signed by the San Diego Chargers on July 29, 2016. On September 3, 2016, he was released by the Chargers.

== Personal life ==
Jones now works full time at Kiewit Corporation.
