= John B. McCoy =

American businessman (born 1943)

John Bonnet McCoy (born June 11, 1943) is a retired American businessman.

== Education ==
McCoy received his BA in history from Williams College in 1965, and his MBA from Stanford University in 1967. In 1983 he succeeded his father John G. McCoy as head of Columbus, Ohio based Banc One Corporation, which his father had built from First Banc Group, the holding company for City National Bank of Columbus, of which his father, John H. McCoy, had been a founder. John B. McCoy presided over further interstate mergers culminating in the union with First Chicago NBD that formed Chicago-based Bank One Corporation in 1998.

== Career ==
He served as chairman from November 1999 and chief executive officer from October 1998 of Bank One Corporation until his retirement in December 1999, and chairman and chief executive officer of its predecessor, Banc One Corporation, from 1987 to 1998. McCoy was named a Director of AT&T Inc. in October 1999. He served as a Director of Ameritech Corporation from 1991 until the company was acquired by AT&T Inc. in 1999. He was also a Director of Cardinal Health, ChoicePoint, Federal Home Loan Mortgage Corporation, and Onex Corporation.
