= American Standards =

American punk band

- Origin: Phoenix, Arizona, U.S.
- Genres: Noise rock, hardcore punk, metalcore, mathcore
- Years active: 2011–2025
- Labels: Victory Records, We Are Triumphant, Enjoyment Records, Torn Flesh, Nacion Libre, Manic Kat Records
- Past members: Brandon Kellum; Corey Skowronski; Steven Mandell; Chris Daley; Brennen Westermeyer; Geoff Gittleson; Cody Conrad; Mike Cook; Mitch Hosier
- Website: American Standards on Facebook

American Standards was an American hardcore punk band from Phoenix, Arizona, formed in 2011. The band consists of members Brandon Kellum (vocals), Corey Skowronski (lead guitar), Steven Mandell (bass), and Chris Daley (drums). Their musical style is rooted in technical hardcore with strong elements of punk and metal. They've garnered much critical and fan acclaim for their high-energy, intense live shows and raw sound. They're also known for Kellum's emotionally and politically charged lyrics, which have included topics such corporate greed, media satire, materialism, loss and personal struggle.

== History ==
=== Formation and first releases (2011–2012) ===
American Standards was formed by Brandon Kellum, Brennen Westermeyer, Geoff Gittleson and Cody Conrad in the wake of multiple now defunct touring bands. Shortly after its inception, Corey Skowronski joined the band on bass guitar after responding to a local craigslist ad. In addition to bass, Corey became an integral part for the band's imaging as he personally designed all merchandise and album artwork. The band quickly gained a devote following for leading a guerrilla punk movement in its community, throwing several basement shows and distributing DIY compilation CDs to raise money for local charities and causes. During this time, the band released multiple home studio demos, including songs such as "Happiness Doesn't Sell". The band's popularity grew with regular airplay on stations KUPD, Radio Phoenix and TheBlaze along with several features in Phoenix New Times, Times Publications and AZ Weekly.

==== Self-titled EP (2011–2012) ====
The band's first unofficial release was a three-song self-titled EP consisting of the songs "The Masks They Wear Resemble Human Faces", "Paradigm alt+shift+delete" and "The Impossibilities Are Endless". It was released independently, with 500 copies being pressed and packaged with handwritten lyrics. There was one video to accompany the release for the song "The Masks They Wear Resemble Human Faces". The song's title was derived from The Twilight Zone episode "Eye of the Beholder", which vocalist Brandon Kellum has commonly cited as inspiration for the band's lyrics. The EP served as the launching pad for several US tours, acting as both headliners and support for bands such as Every Time I Die, Emery, Norma Jean, Comeback Kid, Stray from the Path, He Is Legend, Touché Amoré and The Chariot (band). It also attracted the attention of the Boston-based label, We Are Triumphant, a distributed label of Victory Records.

=== Still Life (2012–2013) ===
Still Life was American Standards' first official release. The seven-song album was initially released independently by the band June 30, 2012, online (iTunes, Amazon, Spotify) and in select stores. There were two full production music videos for the tracks "Harvester" and "The Still Life". There was also a live video for The Red Queen. Still Life solidified the band's attention to well-crafted, thought-provoking lyrics with its opening track, "Self Entitled" being a stripped-down monologue centered around materialism, greed and elitist mentalities. The album also displayed a prominent driving bass guitar, dynamic electric guitars and drums rooted in creative rhythms. It received critical acclaim by national publications such as Absolute Punk and Spudnik as well as international outlets like Thrash Hits and For The Love of Punk. After release, the net label Torn Flesh Records began working with the band to increase its online distribution and the band continued to tour the US extensively to support the album. This is when American Standards announced its signing to We Are Triumphant and the re-release of Still Life with Victory Records backing its distribution through SONY/RED. The rerelease occurred on December 3. This became the last release with the band's original lineup, with Cody Conrad (guitarist) leaving shortly after.

=== The Death of Rhythm and Blues (2013–2014) ===
After the departure of original guitarist Cody Conrad, American Standards decided to carry on as a four-piece. During this time, the band began writing for a full-length while making festival appearances at Within These Walls, Punk Rock Picnic, Infest and Southwest Terror Fest. This allowed the band to share the stage with nationals such as Gwar, Danzig, Dirty Rotten Imbeciles, Total Chaos, Sick of It All, Red Fang and more.

Americans Standards went back to the studio in early July 2013 with the intention to work on a ten-song full-length. Early in this process the band announced on their social media sites that Brennen Westermeyer (guitars) and Geoff Gittleson (drums) would be leaving the band after the release. In addition, the band announced on July 4, 2013, that they had left Victory Records/We Are Triumphant and that the forthcoming release would be scaled back to a 5-song EP titled The Death of Rhythm and Blues.

When released on September 14, 2013, the CD artwork tied in the concept for the EP depicting the iconic scene where legendary blues artist Robert Johnson was said to have met the devil at the crossroads to sell his soul. This imagery was prevalent lyrically throughout the entire EPs landscape, with the most blatant use in the song "Dead Mans Victory". Kellum has cited The Death of Rhythm and Blues as an expression of the desire to create something that will last beyond oneself. He has also noted its concept as symbolical for the loss of the group's original rhythm section and their choice to move forward as a band. The EP was met with great reviews and was featured on several underground top-10 releases lists. Musically, the album stayed true to the raw sound of earlier releases while finding new dynamics in songs such as "The Burden of Being", "Misery Relapse" and "The Engine and the Engineer", in which a music video was filmed for.

During the touring for the EP, Corey Skowronski moved from bass guitar to lead guitar, with Craig Burch of The Last March of The Ents filling in on bass. Mike Cook, formerly of The Author and also in Phoenix-based locals Your Young, assumed the position of drums.

=== Hungry Hands (2014–2015) ===
Only four months after the release of The Death of Rhythm and Blues, American Standards announced that they would be going back to the studio to record a new EP with the band's new line up. At this time, Steven Mandell of a local Arizona group Ape Kill Ape had filled the position of permanent bassist. American Standards explained that this album would be their most dynamic, experimental album to date and expressed the new line up as finally finding the right mix.

The album was funded by a successful Kickstarter campaign, which helped raise over $2,500. The money was used to record at The Residency in Van Nuys, CA with Andy Marshall, who engineered and mixed the album. In addition, three interconnected music videos were filmed to support the release.

Hungry Hands was released May 30, 2014. It was the first time the band had released on CD, Vinyl and Cassette. The band also took a unique approach by releasing independently then teaming with several regional labels to assist with distribution. In the US Torn Flesh assisted with distributing, Nacion Libre in Mexico and Enjoyment Records in the UK.

=== Anti-Melody (2016–2017) ===
American Standards began writing for what was to become their full-length album Anti-Melody in early 2016. During this time the band had transitioned to the drummer Mitch Hosier of the thrash punk band Moovalya. American Standards continued to book DIY tours, now with over 250 shows under their belt and appearances with bands as varied as Atreyu, Zao, Knocked Loose, Oh, Sleeper, '68 (band), Winds Of Plague and Rings Of Saturn (band).

During the writing for Anti-Melody, Brandon Kellum stated;

"What started as social commentary on the growing divide in our society became very personal when our founding guitarist (Cody Conrad) passed of suicide and then soon after, my father of cancer. We went back in to re-write much of the album and in a lot of ways used it as therapy to cope with the experiences. Although intimate, at its core Anti-Melody is centered around the universal theme of separation on many levels."

The album featuring 8 new tracks was recorded at Kingsize Soundlabs in Los Angeles which is known for recording bands such as Bad Religion, The Mars Volta and Letlive. It was mastered by Jason Maas of Defeater and mixed by the band. The first single "Writer's Block Party" was premiered exclusively through Lambgoat on March 17, 2017, when the album was announced for release on April 28, 2017. The album's second single "Carpe Diem, Tomorrow" was premiered April 17, 2017, through Revolver Magazine and was also featured on Alternative Press.

=== Weep (2018) ===
American Standards released Weep on May 18, 2018. The single, which was accompanied by a music video uploaded to the Beheading The Traitor YouTube channel, was premiered through Decibel (magazine) with a Reddit AMA on r/metalcore the same day.

=== Phantom Limb (2019) ===
The band released Phantom Limb on February 1, 2019. The single, which was mixed and mastered by Kevin Antreassian of The Dillinger Escape Plan, was premiered on Metal Injection with a Reddit AMA on r/metalcore. Phantom Limb was also featured in issue 360 of Alternative Press magazine.

=== The Pendulum, The Podium (2020–2021) ===
In 2020, American Standards played its last shows with The Number Twelve Looks Like You and Greyhaven before the COVID-19 pandemic. During this time, the band played a number of live stream charity events supporting local businesses impacted by the lockdowns.

On August 27, 2021 American Standards premiered “The Pendulum, The Podium” via Metal Insider. The single was recorded and mixed by Aaron Mitchell and mastered by John Naclerio (My Chemical Romance, Senses Fail, He Is Legend) at Nada Recording and was released on Manic Kat Records. The track was also the debut of the band‘s new drummer Chris Daley. Soon after, American Standards played its first show back since the onset of the COVID-19 pandemic with Arizona natives, The Bled.

=== Dopamine Dealer (2022–2023) ===
On December 2, 2022 American Standards announced its forthcoming ep “Dopamine Dealer”. The news was accompanied by a new single titled “The Dealer” which premiered on Lambgoat. The publication called the song “a blistering new track tackling themes of existentialism and self-doubt” drawing comparisons to chaotic metalcore bands Every Time I Die and The Chariot. The song was also featured on Kerrang Radio and Alternative Press among other notable publications.

Following the single release, American Standards went on tour playing festival dates with bands such as Cult Leader, The Casket Lottery, and Mutoid Man. The band also played the farewell show for Phoenix, AZ locals Okilly Dokilly which attempted to break the current Guinness World Records record for the “Most People Dressed Like Characters from The Simpsons in One Place.”

On January 13, 2023 American Standards released the second single from Dopamine Dealer titled ‘The Tourist’ via Decibel (magazine). Vocalist Brandon Kellum said of the song: “Our society breeds a culture that convinces people they don't have enough. We’ve been convinced to chase happiness in the form of material possessions, social status, and an unpromised future. You’re alive now. Savor it.”

“The Vagrant” was announced to be the third and final song on Dopamine Dealer which was released February 3, 2023 via punknews.org.

=== Future Orphans (2025) ===
Future Orphans is the fifth and final studio album by American Standards, released on June 30, 2025. Marking a full-circle moment in the band’s career, the album was released exactly thirteen years after their debut album, ‘‘Still Life’’, which also debuted on June 30, 2012. Both albums were mastered by producer Jay Maas at Getaway Recording.

Future Orphans received positive reviews from critics. ‘‘The Punk Site’’ described the album as American Standards’ “most unhinged and self-aware album yet,” highlighting its blend of technical hardcore aggression and introspective lyrical themes. The review stated that the album “doesn’t just reference their early sound—it weaponizes it,” representing both a sonic evolution and a nod to their underground roots.

American Standards chose to conclude their career with the release of the album, without accompanying live shows or a farewell tour. Frontman Brandon Kellum described it as a tribute to the community that supported the band, emphasizing authenticity and the importance of DIY ethics. Future Orphans was framed as a final statement, reflecting the band’s decision to end on their own terms rather than pursue commercial expectations.

== Members ==
=== Former members ===
Name	Instrument	Membership
Brandon Kellum	vocals	(2011–2025)
Corey Skowronski	guitars, bass guitar	(2011–2013, 2013–2025)
Steven Mandell	bass guitar	(2013–2025)
Chris Daley	drums	(2020–2025)
Mitch Hosier	drums	(2016–2020)
Mike Cook	drums	(2013–2015)
Brennen Westermeyer	lead guitar	(2011–2013)
Geoff Gittleson	drums	(2011–2013)
Cody Conrad	rhythm guitar	(2011–2012; died 2015)

=== Touring members ===
Name	Instrument	Membership
Craig Burch	bass	(2013)
Tommy Mills	drums	(2015)

== Discography ==
- American Standards (2011)
- Still Life (2012)
- The Death of Rhythm and Blues (2013)
- Hungry Hands (2014)
- Anti-Melody (2017)
- Weep (2018)
- Phantom Limb (2019)
- The Pendulum, the Podium (2021)
- Dopamine Dealer (2023)
- Future Orphans (2025)
