= Valley National Bank of Arizona =

Former bank, based in Phoenix, Arizona

- Valley National Bank branch in Safford in the 1950s, prominently showing the bank's longtime octagonal logo
- Industry: Banking
- Founded: January 16, 1900; 126 years ago in Solomonville, Arizona as Gila Valley Bank
- Defunct: March 31, 1992; 34 years ago
- Fate: Acquired by Bank One
- Successor: Bank One
- Headquarters: Valley Center (now Chase Tower), Phoenix, Arizona United States
- Key people: Walter Bimson, chairman (1933-1970)
- Products: Financial services
- Subsidiaries: Valley Bank and Trust Company; California Valley Bank

Valley National Bank of Arizona was a bank based in Phoenix, Arizona, founded in 1900 and acquired by Bank One in 1992. The bank was one of Arizona's leading financial institutions during the 20th century and the last major independent bank in Arizona at the time of its acquisition.

== History ==
=== Formation and early development ===
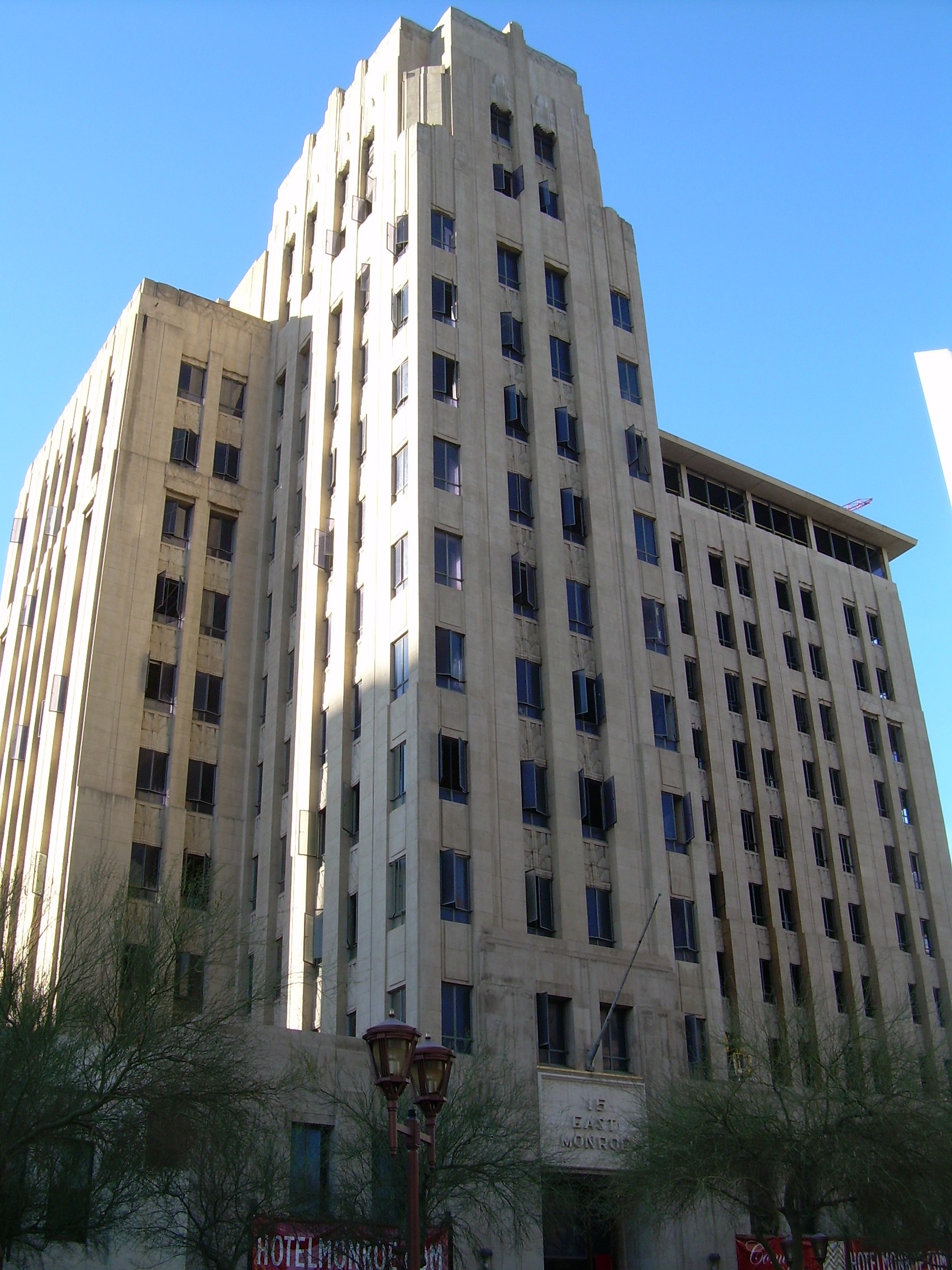
The Professional Building was built in 1932 to house the growing Valley Bank and Trust.

The history of Valley National Bank can be traced back to the establishment of the Gila Valley Bank in Solomonville, Arizona, in Graham County, on January 16, 1900. The primary shareholder of the Gila Valley Bank was town founder Isadore Solomon, who established the town to support the area's copper mines. The bank was well-positioned to contribute to nearby communities in Arizona's copper mining country, such as Safford, Morenci and Clifton. Charles E. Mills was bank president and became the bank's majority shareholder by 1908.

The Valley Bank, another predecessor to Valley National Bank, was a Phoenix-based institution that primarily served agricultural businesses. In 1914, overlending left Valley Bank short on capital, and fearing a run on the bank, shareholders closed the bank in November. They turned to Gila Valley Bank, asking that institution to assist Valley Bank; Mills engineered a bailout with Gila Valley purchasing some Valley Bank assets, and in 1922, the two formally merged forming the Valley Bank of Arizona, led by Mills until his death in 1929. It was renamed The Valley Bank and Trust Company and continued to grow by mergers; upon its 1935 merger with Consolidated National Bank of Tucson, the institution became known as Valley National Bank of Arizona.

In 1932, Valley Bank built a headquarters for the expanding company in conjunction with the Maricopa County Medical Society, the Professional Building. In 1939, Valley Bank took over the entire building; from 1958 to 1972, a large rotating Valley National Bank neon sign adorned the structure.

=== The Great Depression and Walter Bimson ===
The Great Depression hurt Valley Bank severely. In 1933, many banks nationwide were closing their doors. Meanwhile, Walter Bimson, the son of a blacksmith who had studied economics and was working at Harris Trust and Savings Bank in Chicago, traveled to the Southwest and was impressed with the region. In that year, Valley Bank hired Bimson as its president.

Bimson's banking policy broke with conventional wisdom. Amidst the depression, he instructed bank personnel to continue lending, believing that adequate funds existed in the communities but that lending would be the spark needed to restart the economy. These policies began to put Valley Bank at the forefront. Within a year after coming to Arizona, Valley Bank was the first in Arizona to become a member of the Federal Deposit Insurance Corporation, and it was one of the first to provide government-guaranteed home loans; in 1936, one Miami, Arizona, furniture company credited the government's FHA programs and Valley National Bank for a 60% increase in business.

Bimson's policies made Valley National Bank a success; he remained the bank's driving figure until 1952, and stayed on as chairman of the board until 1970.

=== Postwar expansion ===
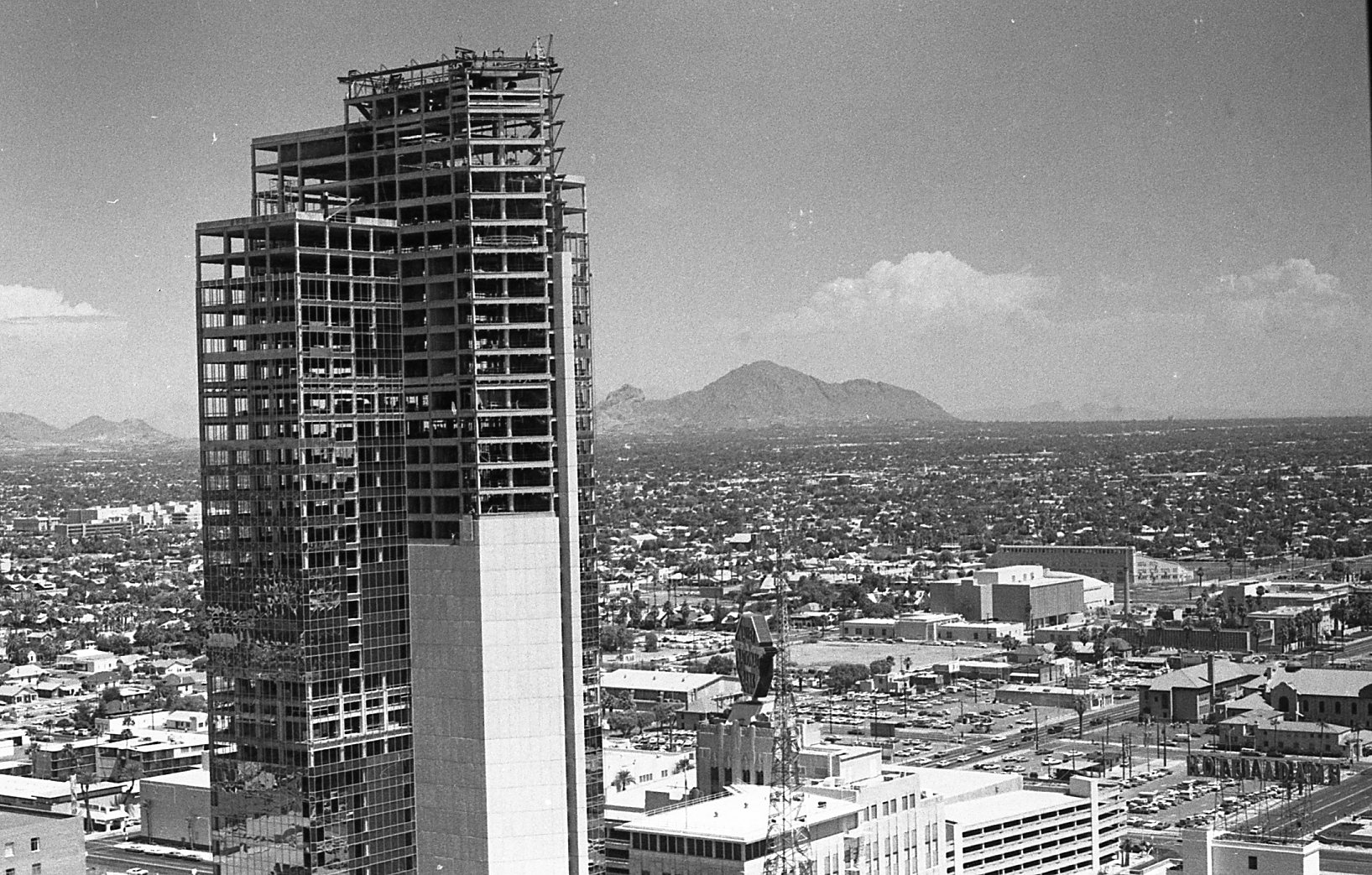
Valley Center under construction, 1972

With the postwar growth of Arizona, Valley National Bank expanded as well. It built branches throughout the rapidly expanding Phoenix metropolitan area and the rest of the state. In a 1961 article in the Los Angeles Times, Arizona senator Barry Goldwater characterized the bank's growth as one that "parallels the explosive progress of Arizona".

In 1972, it built the Valley Center in downtown Phoenix, which remains the tallest building in the state of Arizona; in 1981, it opened its 200th branch, in Solomonville, the town where the bank began. At the same time, it was a pioneer in banking services; it was the first bank in Arizona to issue a credit card in 1965 and the pioneer of direct deposits for Social Security in 1973, a program that was taken nationwide two years later. It also was early with drive-in banking branches and in issuing photo IDs to customers.

=== Interstate banking activities ===
The savings and loan crisis of the late 1980s initially caused major losses at Valley National, which lost $149 million in 1989. The bank rebounded, and posted positive earnings in 1990 ($7.5 million) and 1991 ($34.6 million).

To enable expansion into neighboring states, Valley National Bank reorganized as a holding company called Valley National Corporation on July 1, 1981.

In its first expansion move, Valley National Corp. purchased Fresno, California–based California Valley Bank and Salt Lake City, Utah–based Valley Utah Bancorp in 1987. The acquisitions were not renamed. At the time of merger with Valley Utah, Valley National Bank had 250 branch offices in Arizona and Valley Utah had 35 branches in Utah. By 1988, Valley National halted their interstate expansion plans due to troubled foreign loans in its portfolio. Within a year, its cash flow was severe enough that Valley National was seriously considering selling its out-of-state bank holdings. To economize, less-productive branch offices were closed. Within a few months, the real estate market recovered enough that Valley National decided to retain its out-of-state banks.

=== Bank One Arizona ===
On April 14, 1992, Valley National Corp. announced its merger with Bank One for $1.2 billion ($2.75 billion in 2025 dollars) in stock. At the time of the merger, it had 206 Arizona branches, plus 35 in Utah (where it operated as Valley Bank and Trust Company of Utah) and seven in California (under the name California Valley Bank), and it held $11 billion in assets. The merger was finalized on March 31, 1993, and the holding companies Valley National Corp. became Banc One Arizona and Valley Utah Bancorp became Banc One Utah. The banks Valley National Bank became Bank One Arizona, Valley Bank and Trust became Bank One Utah, and California Valley Bank became Bank One Fresno. Within two years of the merger, Banc One withdrew from California by selling Bank One Fresno to ValliCorp Holdings, the holding company of Valliwide Bank, formerly the Bank of Fresno.

In May 1994, Banc One Corporation increased their holdings in Arizona by acquiring the 58 of 60 Arizona offices of the failed San Diego–based Great American Bank from the Resolution Trust Corporation for $49.36 million. The newly acquired offices were added to the Banc One Arizona holding company and integrated into Bank One Arizona.

Some Valley National Bank branches and offices, including Valley Center (now known as Chase Tower), are still occupied by Bank One's successor, Chase.

== Historic buildings ==
Four buildings associated with Valley National Bank are listed on the National Register of Historic Places in Arizona:

- The Gila Valley Bank and Trust Building in Globe, constructed in 1909
- The Valley National Bank Building in Tucson, constructed in 1929 for Consolidated National Bank of Tucson and the oldest skyscraper in the city
- The Professional Building in Phoenix, home of The Valley Bank and Trust/Valley National Bank from 1932 to 1972
- The Valley National Bank branch in Casa Grande, constructed in 1950

== Art ==
Valley National Bank retained a large art collection, displayed at its offices and branch locations, until the bank's 1992 acquisition. By then, the collection featured 3,500 pieces and was large enough that the art was displayed on every floor of Valley Center (including in the building's Walter Reed Bimson Gallery of Art), in every Valley National Bank branch, and additionally filled a large warehouse; the bank also employed an art curator. The collection was sold off by Bank One upon its acquisition of Valley National, and the pieces are in the hands of museums, private collectors, and with JPMorgan Chase in Manhattan.
