= Valley National Bank (Casa Grande, Arizona) =

- U.S. National Register of Historic Places
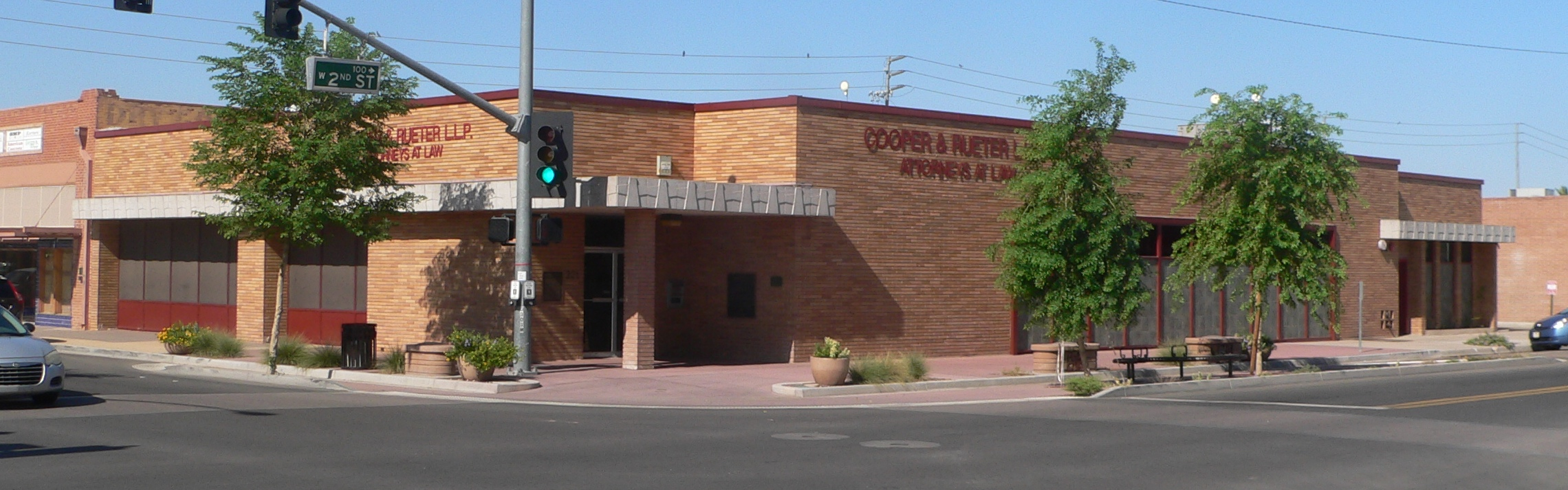

- Location within Arizona Location within the United States
- Location: 221 N. Florence St., Casa Grande, Arizona
- Coordinates: 32°52′14″N 111°45′12″W
- Area: less than one acre
- Built: 1950
- Built by: Homes & Son Construction Company
- Architect: H. H. Green
- Architectural style: Early Commercial
- MPS: Casa Grande, Arizona MPS
- NRHP reference No.: 02000733
- Added to NRHP: November 20, 2002

The Valley National Bank branch in Casa Grande, Arizona, is a commercial building in that city's downtown. It was built in 1950 and listed on the National Register of Historic Places in 2002.

== History ==
Construction started on the building in August 1949 and it was completed in 1950 for Valley National Bank of Arizona. Valley National was one of the state's most prominent financial institution in the 20th century. H. H. Green of Phoenix designed the structure and it was built by Homes & Son Construction Company also of Phoenix. It is located on a corner lot facing a major intersection in downtown Casa Grande, centrally located within the original town site.

Valley National was one of the first banks in the state to open branches in its smaller communities. In 1934, the bank opened its first branch in town; this location was in use until 1991.

The location of the building, at the intersection of Second Street and Florence, is also important to its history. In the 1940s, Casa Grande began to experience prosperity, further accelerating new, automobile-centric development not along Main Street and the railroad. The northern area of town developed such that by 1952, Second Street, not Main Street, represented the main highway through Casa Grande.

== Architecture ==
The building is constructed of a steel frame with brick sheathing and is about 5,000 square feet (460 m^{2}) in size. The building has a T-shaped layout, with an entry canopy that makes the building more rectangular in shape. The exterior also features accents of concrete and cast stone.

Important features include the exterior canopy, windows and doors. The canopy is concrete with a brick support column, while the windows are large plate glass with aluminum frames, placed in several groupings.

The building is highly horizontal; the canopy's inclusion as a soffit across the facade and the banks of windows help emphasize this design.

In September 1960, the interior received a remodeling, with a replacement of the windows and doors with new, similar ones. A cast stone motif featuring a thunderbird was added to the canopies.

== See also ==
- List of historic properties in Casa Grande, Arizona
