= Wingspan Bank =

WingspanBank
- Company type: Public
- Industry: Finance and Insurance
- Founded: 1999
- Headquarters: Wilmington, Delaware
- Key people: Jim Stewart, CEO; Bill Wallace, CIO; Jeff Unkle, VP Corporate Affairs
- Products: Financial services
- Owner: Bank One
- Website: http://www.wingspanbank.com/

Wingspan Bank (branded as Wingspanbank.com) was a U.S. bank operating solely via the Internet from 1999 to 2001. It was a wholly owned subsidiary of Bank One. The CEO was Jim Stewart, previously of the parent bank's First USA division.

The bank began operations on June 24, 1999, with the marketing slogan "If your bank could start over, this is what it would be." An aggressive online marketing campaign was carried out to promote the bank, which also received wide coverage in mainstream financial press. The venture also benefited from its parent's existing marketing agreements with major web portals such as America Online, MSN, and Excite. A marketing agreement was also entered into with then-major search engine/portal Lycos. An additional incentive was the promise of a $100 reward to the first 10,000 customers. There was also an introductory 10% interest for a short period when opening a new checking account.

Despite being owned by Bank One, an existing brick and mortar banking institution based in Chicago, Wingspan was branded wholly separately and with minimal acknowledgment of the relationship. As a result, Wingspan's online-only operation effectively competed with Bank One's own online presence, particularly as the online bank's lack of physical presence allowed it to provide better fees and rates for customers. The bank provided most traditional financial services from interest-bearing checking accounts to credit cards, Individual Retirement Accounts and HELOCs. It also provided bill pay, with on-time payment guarantee, although the payment was physically done via the bank mailing a check to the payee in most cases.

The lack of physical presence was ultimately a negative for the bank. While customers were able to use Bank One ATMs for free, they could not use any physical bank branches. Non-electronic deposits had to be made via postal mail. The bank refunded up to $5 in ATM fees per month for customers not living in Bank One's footprint.

By September 2001, Bank One discontinued the Wingspan brand and rolled the online bank's customers into Bank One's existing online service as regular account holders. The parent company cited the online bank's inability to attract a sufficient number of customers as the reason for its closure. The reintegration of Bank One's online venture followed a similar action by Citibank with its Citi/fi brand, and other online banks such as Telebank merged with or entered into service agreements with physical banks.

CEO Jim Stewart left Wingspan in late 1999 to form Juniper Financial.

== See also ==
- Online banking
- Bank One
- NetBank
