= Mohave County Hospital =

Former hospital in Arizona, United States

- U.S. National Register of Historic Places
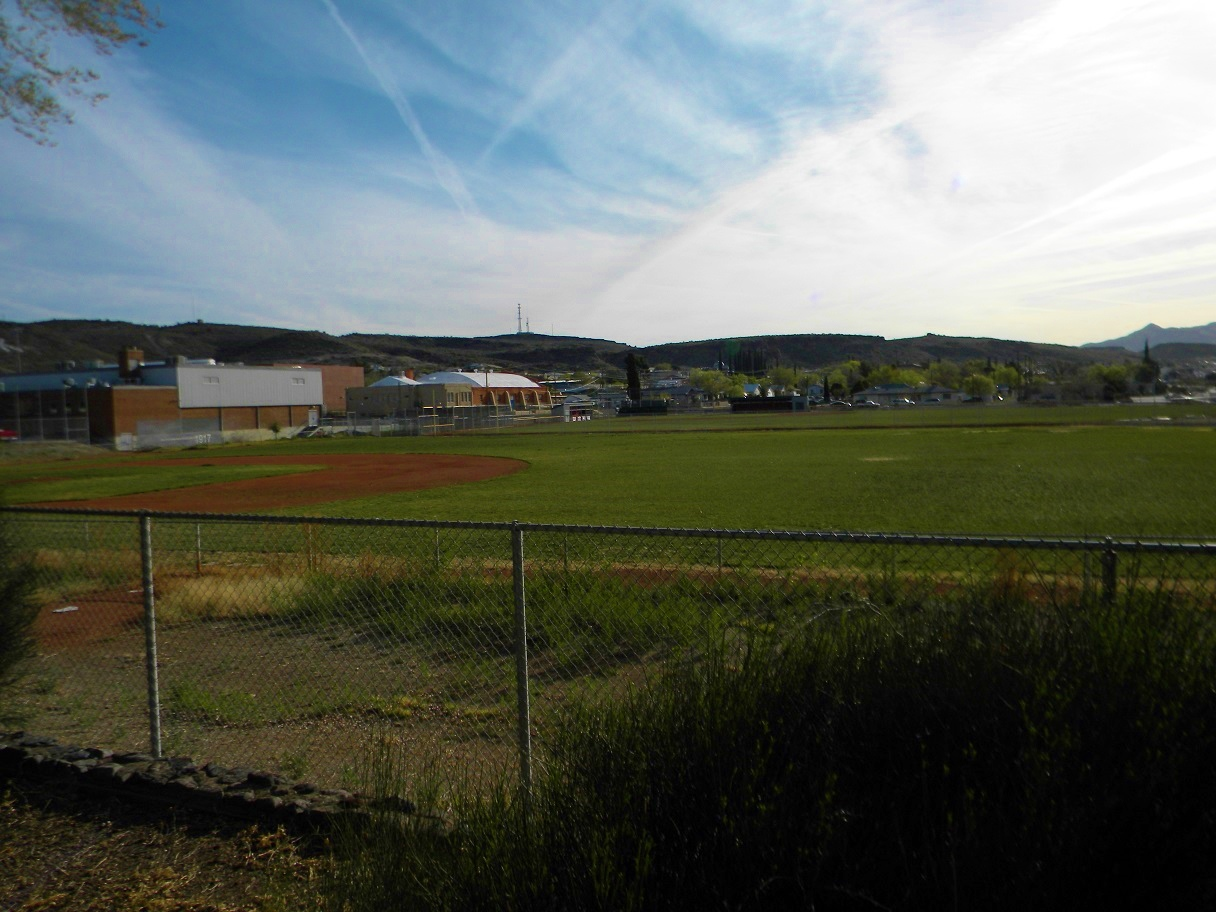
- Site of the hospital

- Location within Arizona Location within the United States
- Location: Kingman, Mohave County, Arizona
- Coordinates: 35°11′26″N 114°3′33″W
- Built: 1921; Demolished: 2008
- Architect: Atchison, Topeka and Santa Fe Railway Engineering Department; Contractor: J.B. Lammers
- Architectural style: Mission Revival/Spanish Colonial Revival
- MPS: Kingman MRA
- NRHP reference No.: 86001165
- Added to NRHP: May 14, 1986

The Mohave County Hospital was between Grand View and First Street on Beale Street, in Kingman, Mohave County, western Arizona.

== History ==
The Santa Fe Railway Engineering Department designed the building in the Spanish Colonial Revival style. The hospital was built in 1921–22, and J. B. Lammers of Flagstaff was the contractor. Additional hospital wings were added to the building in the 1940s and in 1962.

Mohave County General Hospital was the main hospital in Mohave County until 1970, when it moved to a new location. After that, county departments moved into the vacant building. The last and longest was the Mohave County Sheriffs Office, who had moved from the old court house building into the former hospital.

The hospital was placed on the National Register of Historic Places in 1986, with the designation number 86001165.

However, the hospital was demolished in 2008.
