= Bank One Corporation =

American bank (1968 to 2004)

- Trade name: Bank One
- Formerly: First Banc Group (1968–1979); Banc One Corporation (1979–1998)
- Type: public
- Traded as: NYSE: ONE (1979–2004)
- Industry: banking
- Founded: 1968; 58 years ago
- Defunct: July 1, 2004; 22 years ago
- Fate: Acquired by JPMorgan Chase
- Successor: JPMorgan Chase
- Headquarters: Bank One Plaza, Chicago Loop, Chicago, Illinois, United States
- Key people: Jamie Dimon; John B. McCoy; Frank E. McKinney, Jr.
- Products: financial services
- Website: bankone.com

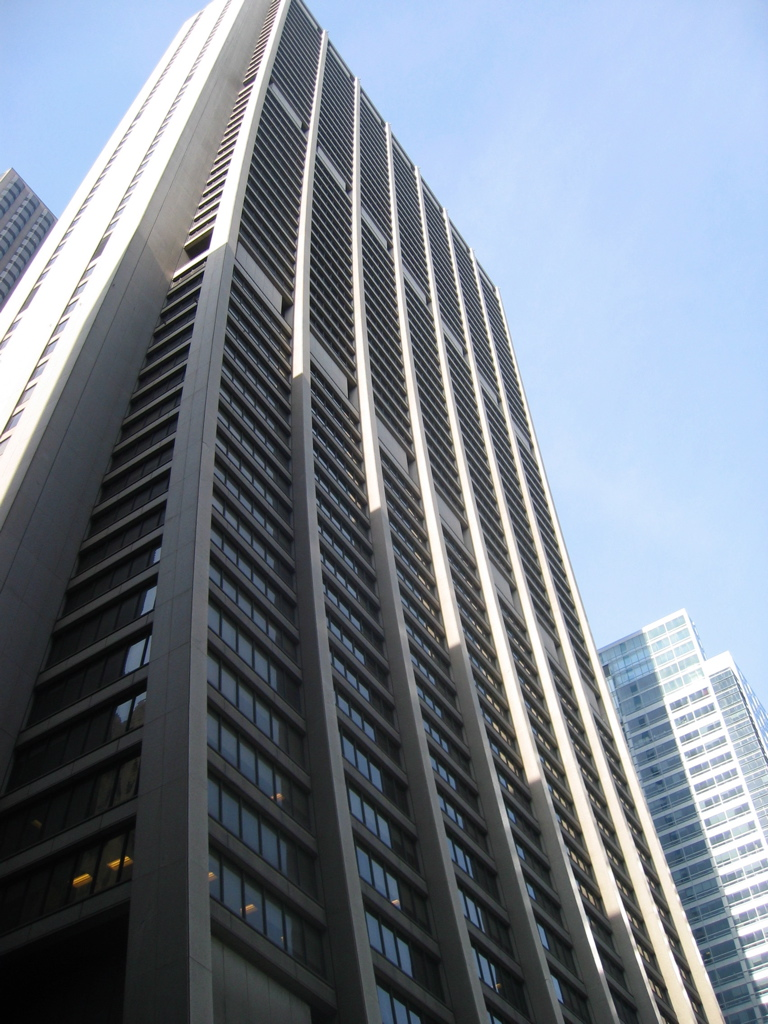
The Chase Tower (formerly the Bank One Plaza) housed the Bank One headquarters

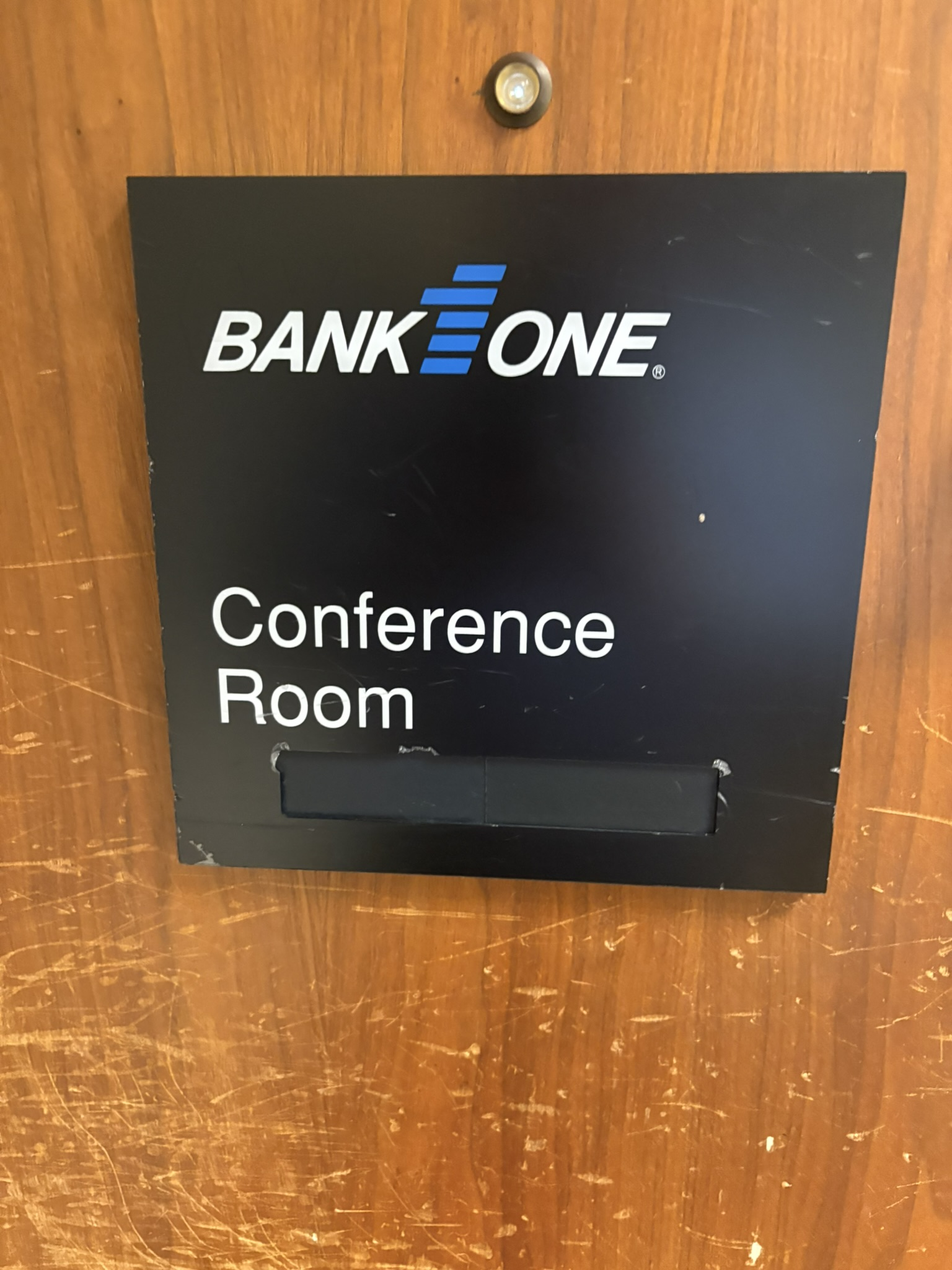
Bank 1 Conference Room Plaque in the Chase Tower Chase Branch - Milwaukee, WI September 2025

Bank One Corporation was an American bank founded in 1968 and at its peak the sixth-largest bank in the United States. It traded on the New York Stock Exchange under the stock symbol ONE. The company merged with JPMorgan Chase & Co. on July 1, 2004, with Bank One CEO Jamie Dimon soon becoming CEO and Chairman of the combined company but under the JPMorgan Chase brand. The company had its headquarters in the Bank One Plaza (Chase Tower) in the Chicago Loop in Chicago, Illinois, the headquarters of Chase's retail banking division.

Bank One traces its roots to the merger of Illinois based First Chicago NBD, and Ohio-based First Banc Group (later Bank One), a holding company for the City National Bank in Columbus, Ohio.

== History ==
=== First Banc Group ===
The First Banc Group, Inc. was formed in 1968 as a holding company for City National Bank and was used as a vehicle to acquire other banks. As Ohio began to gradually relax its very restrictive Great Depression era banking laws that had severely restricted bank branching and ownership, City National Bank, through its First Banc Group parent, started to purchase banks outside of its home county. The first acquisition by the new bank holding company was the 1968 acquisition of the Farmers Saving & Trust Company in Mansfield, Ohio. With each acquisition, new member banks kept their name, employees, and management while obtaining new resources from the parent holding company. This was very important when the bank holding company was expanding into primarily rural and extremely conservative markets.

In 1971, First Banc acquired Security Central National in Portsmouth, Ohio.

Initially, Ohio law did not permit bank mergers across county lines but allowed bank holding companies to own multiple banks across the state with some geographical restrictions. The newly acquired banks had to maintain their existing banking charters while each bank had to operate separately. Holding companies also were not allowed to have the word "bank" in their names so the word "banc" was used in its place.

=== Expansions by Banc One ===
==== Expansion in central Ohio by Banc One Corp. ====
Although Ohio law still had restricted bank mergers outside a certain geographic area, the holding company management decided to unify the marketing efforts of its member banks by having all of its members banks adopt similar names. In October 1979, First Banc Group, Inc. became Banc One Corporation, and each member bank became Bank One followed by the city or the geographic area that the member bank served. For example, City National Bank was renamed Bank One Columbus, Security Central National Bank became Bank One Portsmouth, and Farmers Saving & Trust Company became Bank One Mansfield.

In 1980, Banc One acquired banks in Painesville, Ohio (Lake County National Bank; Bank One Painesville), Akron, Ohio (Firestone Bank; Bank One Akron), and Youngstown, Ohio (Union National Bank; Bank One Youngstown).

Winters National Bank in Dayton, Ohio, was acquired in 1982 and renamed Bank One Dayton. The merger with Winters National Corporation brought into the Bank One organization 42 Winters National Bank & Trust Co. branch offices in the greater Dayton area, a branch in Cincinnati and three offices in Circleville. Also added were 21 Euclid National Bank branch offices in the Cleveland area which were renamed Bank One Cleveland.

==== Early expansion outside Ohio ====
With the change in federal and state banking laws in 1985, Banc One began to rapidly expand outside of Ohio. Its first out-of-state acquisition was of Purdue National Bank in Lafayette, Indiana, which occurred just after the new laws went into effect. This bank was renamed Bank One Lafayette. This merger was quickly followed by the purchase of other small banks in Indiana and Kentucky, the only states that initially allowed bank purchases by Ohio-based banks.

The bank entered Kentucky by acquiring Citizens Union National Bank & Trust Co. of Lexington, Kentucky, in 1986. This bank was renamed Bank One Lexington.

Banc One acquired the Merrillville, Indiana–based Bank of Indiana and rename it Bank One Merrillville in early 1986. This was quickly followed by acquisitions in Marion, Indiana (First National Bank of Marion; Bank One Marion), Crawfordsville, Indiana (First National Bank and Trust Co. of Crawfordsville; Bank One Crawfordsville), Rensselaer, Indiana (Northwest National Bank of Rensselaer; Bank One Rensselaer) and Richmond, Indiana (First National Bank of Richmond; Bank One Richmond).

The first major merger that had an effect on the management of the holding company occurred in 1986 with the acquisition of Indianapolis-based American Fletcher Corporation, a multi-bank holding company, with its lead bank, American Fletcher National Bank & Trust Company, which resulted in giving 20% of the voting stock in the new company to the former managers of American Fletcher and also had Frank E. McKinney, Jr., the head of American Fletcher, replaced John B. McCoy as president of Banc One Corp. and moved McCoy up to chairman of the combined organization. Another change made in the corporate organization was the formation of a two-tiered management system with the formation of statewide holding companies that were placed in between the regional member banks and the ultimate Banc One parent holding company. So, in Indiana, American Fletcher Corporation became Indianapolis-based Banc One Indiana and all member banks in Indiana, such as Bank One Lafayette, which previously reported directly to the main parent in Columbus, reported to management in Indianapolis instead. The merger resulted in a $597.3 million swap of stock.

The merger with American Fletcher Corp. also brought along four small banks that American Fletcher had just recently acquired or was in the process of acquiring. These banks included Citizens Northern Bank of Elkhart (Bank One Elkhart), Carmel Bank & Trust Co. (Bank One Carmel), First American National Bank of Plainfield (Bank One Plainfield), and Union Bank & Trust Co. of Franklin (Bank One Franklin). Under Indiana law at that time, American Fletcher was not permitted to merge these banks into its main American Fletcher National Bank.

The First National Bank of Bloomington in Bloomington, Indiana, was acquired in 1987. This bank became Bank One Bloomington. With the acquisition of the Bloomington-based bank, Banc One temporarily ceased further acquisitions in the state in Indiana since they had reached that state's cap of the percentage of ownership within that state at that time.

==== Early expansion into Michigan ====
Bank One expanded into the state of Michigan in late 1986 by acquiring the Citizens State Bank in Sturgis, Michigan, and convert it into Bank One Sturgis. Within a few months of the Sturgis acquisition, additional acquisitions were quickly made in East Lansing, Michigan (East Lansing State Bank; Bank One East Lansing), Fenton, Michigan (First National Bank of Fenton; Bank One Fenton) and Ypsilanti, Michigan (National Bank of Ypsilanti; Bank One Ypsilanti) a few months later.

Seven years later, Citizens Banking Corp. announced in September 1994 that they were acquiring all four Michigan banks in East Lansing, Fenton, Sturgis, and Ypsilanti from Banc One for $115 million. The divestiture was completed in February 1995.

The Bank One brand did not return to Michigan until the 1998 merger with First Chicago NBD which resulted in the rebranding of the former NBD offices.

==== Expansion into Wisconsin ====
Banc One's first acquisition in a state that did not share a common border with the state of Ohio occurred in 1987 with the acquisition of Marine Corporation, the third-largest bank holding company in Wisconsin, after First Wisconsin Corporation and Marshall & Ilsley Corporation. The result of this merger brought into organization 21 banks and 76 offices in Wisconsin with Marine Corp. being renamed Banc One Wisconsin Corp. and each of the subsidiary Marine Banks were renamed Bank One along their respective affiliated geographical based name. The lead bank, Marine Bank, N.A., became Bank One Milwaukee. The merger came about Marine was trying to resist an unwanted acquisition attempt by Marshall & Ilsley that was initiated in June 1987 which would have resulted in massive firings.

Prior to the unwanted overtures by Marshall & Ilsley, Marine went on a buying spree as soon as Wisconsin and surrounding states started loosening their restrictive bank branching and ownership laws and Marine had recently purchased banks throughout Wisconsin and most recently had purchased a bank with three branch offices in the state of Minnesota and another bank in the state of Illinois just a few months before. In late December 1986, Marine entered the Chicago market by initiating the purchase of the American branch of the Italian bank Banco di Roma, which was renamed Marine Bank Chicago. Since Minnesota and Illinois forbade the bank ownership by companies based in Ohio, Marine had to sell those banks before the merger was permitted to proceed. The Minnesota banks were sold to First Bank System while the Chicago bank was sold to a lawyer with the understanding that Banc One wanted the Chicago bank back as soon as the Illinois banking laws would permit ownership by Ohio-based companies, which eventually happened in December 1990. The lawyer was able to sell the bank back to Banc One within two years at a substantial profit.

==== Expansion into Texas ====
Banc One entered the state of Texas in 1989 through the acquisition of a number of failed banks that were seized by the Federal Deposit Insurance Corporation (FDIC) as a result of the late 1980s banking crises in Texas that was caused by the defaulting of a large number of real estate and energy sector loans when energy prices dropped and large numbers of people lost their jobs as a result. Although Banc One could obtain failed banks at a discount that were subsidized by the Federal government, they could also be stuck with loans in which borrowers could later default on if the economic crises worsen.

The first banks to be acquired were 20 banks that were formerly owned by MCorp, which the FDIC had consolidated into a single bank that they named the Deposit Insurance Bridge Bank. The FDIC had seized the banks in March 1989. The failure of 20 of MCorp's 24 banks cost the FDIC $2.8 billion. MCorp was the second largest bank holding company in Texas at the time of its failure. MCorp was formed in 1984 through the merger of Mercantile National Bank of Dallas with Bank of the Southwest of Houston with Mercantile becoming MBank Dallas and Southwest becoming MBank Houston.

After the acquisition, the Deposit Insurance Bridge Bank became Bank One Texas with Banc One Texas formed as the state holding company. Banc One brought in managers from other parts of the Banc One organization to correct mistakes which led to the insolvency, though they kept on a few key MCorp staff whose leadership and connections were considered crucial to the transformation. Laws were changed in Texas that would allow Banc One, and other purchasers of failed banks, to operate a single bank statewide instead of being restricted by narrow geographical regions.

The next acquisition that occurred in Texas was the purchase of the failed Bright Banc Savings a few months later from the Resolution Trust Corporation in 1990. This failed savings and loan association cost the federal government $1.4 billion. The 48 former branch offices were integrated into Bank One Texas, which had 63 branch offices at that time. The following year, Banc One acquired 13 Houston-area offices of the failed Benjamin Franklin Savings from the RTC for $36 million.

In 1992, Banc One acquired Team Bancshares of Dallas, a company that was formed by a private investor group in 1988 to acquire failed and weak Texas banks, for $782 million in Banc One stock. The acquisition of Team Bank brought 56 branches into Banc One Texas, which then had 146, though a few branches needed to be closed because of branch overlaps. After this acquisition, Bank One Texas remained as the next largest bank in the state after NationsBank. The acquisition of Team Bancshares was unusual in Texas during this period since Team was making a profit at the time of sale.

==== Expansion into Illinois ====
Compared to other states, Illinois was very slow to allow statewide branching and multi-bank holding companies. When Illinois finally removed its last prohibition on interstate banking in December 1990, the first thing that Banc One did was to complete its planned acquisition of Marine Bank Chicago in downtown Chicago. In 1992, Banc One acquired the Marine Corp. of Springfield in Central Illinois with its 15 banking locations in Springfield, Bloomington, Champaign, and Monticello for $193 million in stock. Marine Corp. of Springfield was renamed Banc One Illinois and Marine's lead bank, Marine Bank of Springfield, became Bank One Springfield. A few months later, Banc One acquired First Illinois with its 15 offices in suburban Chicago for $349 million in stock. Because the Illinois legislature was slow in removing obstacles against interstate banking, Banc One had to compete with Northwest and NBD, along with some Chicago-based banks, to obtain available banks in key markets in Illinois.

==== Later expansion into Kentucky ====
After a five-year acquisition lull in the state of Kentucky, Banc One increased its presence in northeast central Kentucky with the acquisition of Lexington-based First Security Corporation of Kentucky with its 28 offices for $204 million in stock in 1992. Most of the First Security offices were folded into Bank One Lexington with a few offices were closed because they were too close to an existing branch.

Although Banc One had a presence in Kentucky since 1986, it had little or no presence beyond Lexington and suburban Cincinnati. To remedy this problem, Banc One acquired Louisville-based Liberty National Bancorp with its 104 banking offices located throughout Kentucky and Southern Indiana in 1994 for $842 million in stock. At the time of the acquisition, Liberty National Bancorp was the largest bank holding company in Kentucky that was still headquartered in that state. Liberty National Bancorp was renamed Banc One Kentucky and its lead bank, Liberty National Bank and Trust Company of Kentucky, became Bank One Kentucky. As a result of the merger, Bank One Lexington was placed under the supervision of the new Banc One Kentucky holding company.

==== Expansion into the western states ====
In the 1992, Banc One announced the pending acquisitions of two western-based holding bank holding companies, Denver-based Affiliated Bankshares of Colorado and Phoenix-based Valley National Corporation, that would give the company access to new markets in Colorado, Arizona, Utah, and California.

Banc One paid $378 million in stock to stockholders of Affiliated Bankshares for 27 affiliate banks with 38 offices in Colorado and $1.2 billion in stock to stockholders of Valley National for 206 offices in Arizona operating under the name Valley National Bank of Arizona (renamed Bank One Arizona), 35 offices in Utah operating under the name Valley Bank and Trust of Utah (renamed Bank One Utah), and 7 offices in California operating under the name California Valley Bank (renamed Bank One Fresno). Affiliated Bankshares was renamed Banc One Colorado and Valley National Corp. was renamed Banc One Arizona.

Since all of the new offices in California were located in remote Fresno and far away from the large metropolitan areas of Los Angeles and San Francisco, Banc One had little opportunity to make a significant move into California and was not able to compete efficiently against California-based banks such as Bank of America and Wells Fargo. After two years of ownership, Banc One decided to withdraw from California market completely by selling Bank One Fresno to ValliCorp Holdings, the holding company for Valliwide Bank, formerly the Bank of Fresno.

In May 1994, Banc One increased their holdings in Arizona by acquiring the 58 of 60 Arizona offices of the failed San Diego–based Great American Bank from the Resolution Trust Corporation for $49.36 million. The newly acquired offices were integrated into Bank One Arizona.

==== Expansion into West Virginia ====
In 1993, Banc One entered the state of West Virginia by acquiring Key Centurion Bancshares, the largest bank holding company in West Virginia with 54 offices throughout West Virginia and parts of eastern Kentucky, for $536 million in stock.

==== Expansion into Oklahoma ====
Banc One entered into Oklahoma by acquiring the Central Banking Group in Oklahoma City, with its eight offices all located in Oklahoma City, for $96 million in stock in 1994. Thirty months later, Banc One entered Tulsa by the acquisition of Liberty Bancorporation of Oklahoma City for $546 million in stock in 1997. Liberty had 29 offices in Oklahoma City and Tulsa at the time of the acquisition.

==== Expansion into Louisiana ====
Banc One entered Louisiana by acquiring the assets of Premier Bancorp of Baton Rouge, the third-largest bank holding company in the state with 150 offices, for $700 million in stock in 1996. Although the merger was consummated in January 1996, the relationship between the two organizations goes back much further. The just recently retired and former head of Premier, and its predecessor Louisiana National Bank, was Charles "Chuck" McCoy, the younger brother of John G. McCoy and uncle to John B. McCoy. In 1991, Premier received $65 million from Banc One to help cover its debts in an exchange for the right for Banc One to acquire Premier within the next five years. Premier acquired most of its debts during the economic downturn that had hit Louisiana during the late 1980s. Premier Bancorp became Banc One Louisiana and Premier Bank became Bank One Louisiana.

The following year, Banc One acquired First Commerce Corporation of New Orleans for $3.5 billion in stock. At the time of the acquisition in 1998, First Commerce was the largest Louisiana-based financial institution in the state. The acquisition included the lead bank First National Bank of Commerce plus five other regional banks with a combined total of 144 banking offices. All of the acquired banks were consolidated into Bank One Louisiana.

=== Acquisition of First USA ===
In 1997, Banc One decided to expand its national credit card business by acquiring the Dallas-based First USA for $7.9 billion in stock. Prior to this acquisition, most Bank One credit card accounts were issued and serviced by the various local Bank One banks. For example, most Bank One Indianapolis customers had credit cards that were issued and serviced by Bank One Indianapolis via the former American Fletcher credit card center prior to the acquisition.

Unfortunately for Banc One and especially for John B. McCoy, First USA would later cause problems for its new parent by generating unexpected losses that were caused by mismanagement and by questionable decisions that were made in the attempt to increase profitability.

==== History of First USA before Banc One ====
First USA was originally formed in Dallas as a subsidiary of MCorp that was called MNet. It was formed in 1985 to handle the back end work for providing credit cards, electronic banking, and other consumer services through member banks of the Texas bank holding company. To issue credit cards, MCorp (via MNet) established a credit card issuing bank in Wilmington, Delaware, called MBank USA. Although, the MNet division was generating a profit, the rest of MCorp began suffering huge loses when customers began to default on their mortgage payments that were the result of the economic downturn that had begun in Texas. In attempt to save itself, MCorp sold MNet to Lomas & Nettleton Financial Corporation the following year for $300 million in cash and securities.

After the acquisition by Lomas, MNet was renamed Lomas Bankers Corp. and MBank USA was renamed Lomas Bank USA. Under Lomas, the credit card company aggressively acquired new customers by purchasing credit card accounts from other credit card issuers. In 1987, Lomas Bank USA acquired 230,000 accounts from two banks in Louisiana, 23,000 accounts from a bank in Amarillo, 260,000 accounts from two banks in Oklahoma, and 90,000 accounts from a bank in San Antonio. In 1988, Lomas acquired 80,000 accounts from a bank in New York. In 1989, Lomas & Nettleton Financial was in financial trouble and was forced to sell its credit card division. Lomas sold Lomas Bankers Corp. and Lomas Bank USA to an investor group led by Merrill Lynch Capital Partners for $500 million in cash and preferred stock.

After the sale to the consortium led by Merrill Lynch, Lomas Bankers Corp. was renamed First USA, Inc. and Lomas Bank USA was renamed First USA Bank. At the time of the Merrill Lynch acquisition in 1989, Lomas Bankers–First USA was the 11th-largest issuer of credit cards in the nation.

In 1992, First USA reduced some of its debt by going public. First attempt to sell stock occurred in late January, but the offer was quickly withdrawn because the stock market had dropped too low. A more successful attempt was made four months later in which $43 million was raised in the stock sale. At the time of the IPO in 1992, First USA was the 14th-largest issuer of credit cards in the nation.

Most of the growth of the company during the 1980s and early 1990s were the results from the acquisition of credit cards accounts from banks needing to sell some assets for quick cash to stave off insolvency, or from banks that had ceased issuing and servicing their own credit cards accounts because they either could not compete with the larger credit card issuers such as First USA. As more bank credit card accounts became concentrated in a few large issuers during the 1990s, fewer banks had credit card accounts to sell, so large issuers switched to direct marketing to obtain more cardholders. Those issuers started offering no annual fee cards with introductory interest rates that quickly increased after a set time. This led to fierce competition among the remaining credit card issuers, especially in the fight to attract lucrative customers: those who maintain large monthly revolving balances. These are the same customers who could cause problems for the bank if the local economy turns sour.

At this time, First USA was generating profits as high as nearly 25% on its owners' investment, which was phenomenal since a return of 1% on its assets is usually considered great for most other sectors of banking. The high rate of return was one of the factors that attracted Banc One to the acquisition of First USA.

==== History of First USA after the acquisition by Banc One ====
Banc One first announced the proposed acquisition of First USA in January 1997. Wall Street reaction to news caused Banc One's stock to drop 8%. First USA was the fourth-biggest credit card issuer in the nation at the time of the announcement. The acquisition was finalized six months later. First USA Chairman and co-founder (in 1985) John Tolleson was appointed a Banc One director while First USA president and co-founder Richard Vague was appointed chairman and CEO of First USA.

=== History of Bank One Corporation ===
In 1998, Banc One Corporation merged with Chicago-based First Chicago NBD – the result of the 1995 merger of First Chicago Corp. and NBD Bancorp, two large banking companies who had themselves been created through the merger of many banks) – to form Bank One Corporation, and moved its headquarters from Columbus to Chicago.

To allow the Banc One merger with First Chicago NBD to proceed, the Justice Department required the two bank holding companies to divest 39 branch offices in Indiana because of overlap by mostly former AFNB and INB offices. To satisfy the federal regulator decision, the holding companies signed an agreement with Union Planters Corporation for Union Planters to acquire 51 branch offices in central Indiana in exchange for $294 million. Most of the offices that were sold were former INB offices.

Adverse financial results led to the departure of CEO John B. McCoy, whose father and grandfather had headed Banc One and predecessors. Jamie Dimon, a former key executive of Citigroup, was brought in to head the company.

In 1998, Bank One paid $66 million for the naming rights for 30 years to a newly constructed ballpark in Phoenix, which was built for the Major League Baseball expansion team Arizona Diamondbacks. The retractable roof stadium was called Bank One Ball Park, and was ultimately renamed '''Chase Field''' in 2005.

=== Private equity ===
In 2001, Dimon selected former colleague Dick Cashin, from Citicorp Venture Capital to run a new private equity effort within Bank One, One Equity Partners. Dick Cashin is the brother of Steven Cashin, founder and CEO of Pan African Capital Group, based in Washington, D.C.

In 2005, Bank One's private equity affiliate, One Equity Partners, was selected to be the exclusive private equity affiliate for the combined firm, prompting the spinout of JPMorgan's private equity affiliate, which is today CCMP Capital.

== See also ==
- Wingspan Bank
