= Brandon Kellum =

American singer-songwriter

- Born: November 1, 1985 (age 39); Phoenix, Arizona, U.S.
- Origin: Phoenix, Arizona, U.S.
- Genres: mathcore, hardcore punk, Metalcore, Southern Metal, Screamo, Post Hardcore
- Occupation(s): Musician, songwriter, author
- Instrument(s): Vocals, Guitar, Bass
- Years active: 2002–present
- Labels: Victory

Brandon Kellum (born November 1, 1985), is an American musician, author, philanthropist from Phoenix, Arizona best known as the vocalist of the metalcore band American Standards. He is characterized for his charismatic live performances and philosophical lyrical content.

== Early life and education ==
Kellum was born in Phoenix, Arizona. He attended Trevor G. Browne High School and later Arizona State University. He works as a business consultant for a fortune 500 company.

== Musical career ==
=== Vera Lynne/Movie script ending ===
He began his musical career in 2002 as the guitarist for the post hardcore band Vera Lynne which originally performed under the name Movie Script Ending. Vera Lynne was the first of many Monster Energy sponsored artists that went on to play the Vans Warped Tour and play tour dates with bands such as It Dies Today, Still Remains, The Used, As Cities Burn and Avenged Sevenfold. The group disbanded in 2007 after releasing one EP and one LP.

=== The Hostage Situation ===
After disbanding, Brandon formed the southern metal band The Hostage Situation assuming the position of vocals. The band had a tongue in cheek demeanor and was known for its high energy live shows. After releasing the LP "When I Say Go..." and touring in support of it, Hostage called it quits in 2010.

=== American Standards ===
In 2011 Brandon joined American Standards. American Standards was when Kellum started incorporating sociopolitical views into his lyrics which included satire and social commentary. This quality found him as a guest on several media outlets such as Alternative Press, Metal Injection, Revolver Magazine, Decibel Magazine and Lambgoat. American Standards has label backing and distribution through Victory Records and has shared the stage with several bands that Kellum has cited as influences, such as; Every Time I Die, The Chariot, Refused, Zao (American band), Comeback Kid, Atreyu and Emery.

=== Heart Shaped Canvas ===
During this time Kellum founded Heart Shaped Canvas, a nonprofit organization that acts as a collective of artists using their art to raise funds and awareness for the causes they believe in. Through Heart Shaped Canvas, he has hosted benefit shows and released compilation albums supporting organizations such as the American Foundation for Suicide Prevention, Teen Lifeline, Halo Animal Rescue and the American Cancer Society.

=== Side projects ===
In 2014 Brandon joined Your Young as the bassist, touring, recording and opening for bands such as Converge, Glassjaw and Norma Jean. He is seen playing on the music video for the song 'The Sad, Sad Stories of Sadder Men'.

In 2018, Brandon began hosting nostalgia themed DJ nights such as Break Stuff: Nu Metal Night, Top 8: Myspace Night and Free Skate: Tony Hawk Pro Skater Night.

Brandon has also been a regular guest on music industry panels and podcasts such as Make It Loud, Talk Toomey, As The Story Grows, Brewtally Speaking and Apologue.

Brandon is a regular contributor and staff writer for multiple music based websites such as Yum Yum Music And Arts.

== Family ==
He has an older brother named Joe Kellum and mother, Melissa Kellum. His father and grandparents passed of cancer in 2015.
