= Bank of Italy (Livermore, California) =

Historic place in Livermore, California

- U.S. National Register of Historic Places
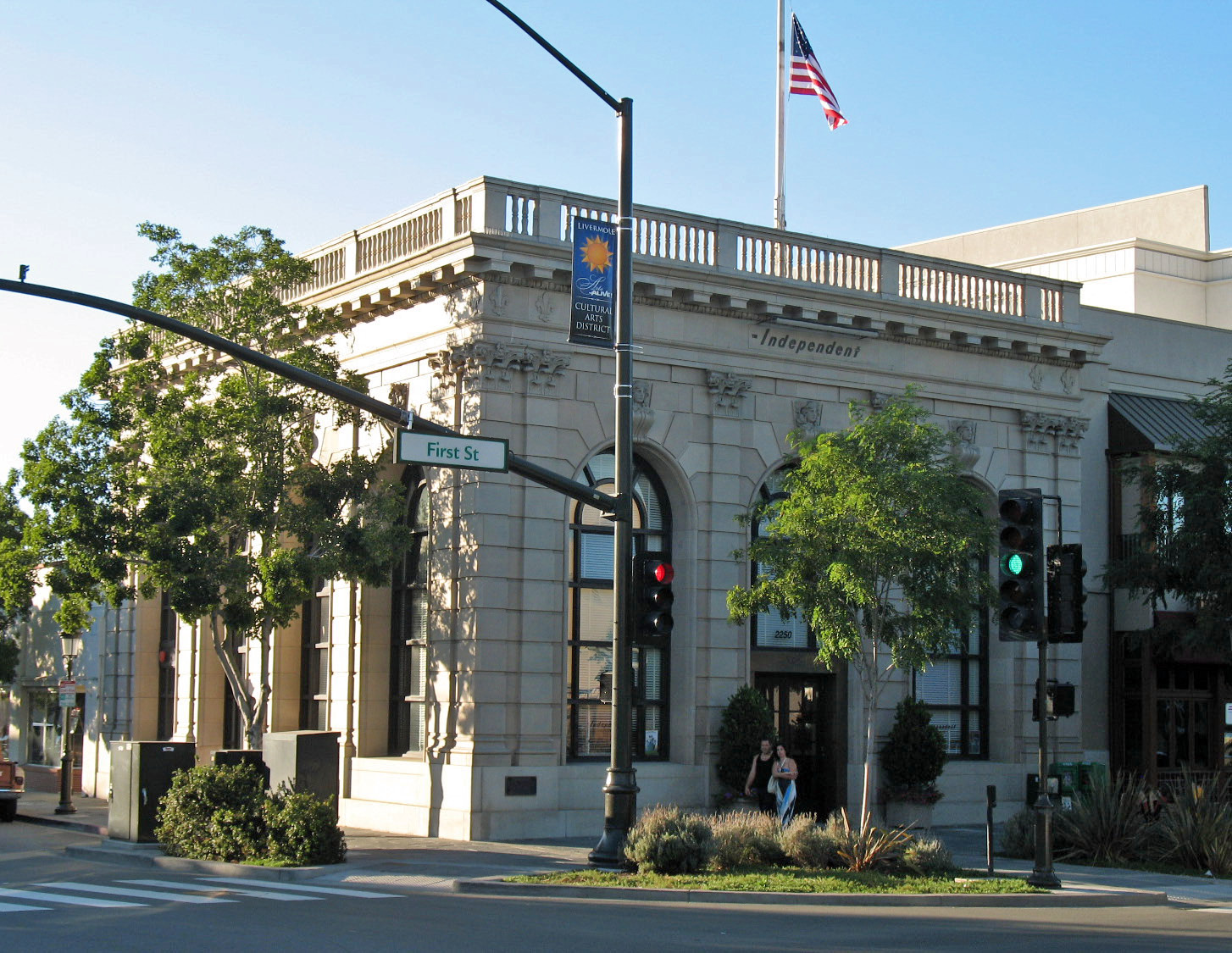
- Bank of Italy in Livermore
- Location: 2250 1st Street, Livermore, California
- Coordinates: 37.682422°N 121.768475°W
- Built: 1921; 105 years ago
- Architect: Edward T. Foulkes
- Architectural style: Second Renaissance Revival – Neoclassical architecture
- NRHP reference No.: 78000648
- Added to NRHP: November 16, 1978

The Bank of Italy Building is a historical building in Livermore, California. It was built in 1921 and listed to the National Register of Historic Places on April 15, 1994. The building was designed by Edward T. Foulkes in the Second Renaissance Revival and Neoclassical architecture. It is made of bricks from the Livermore Fire Brick Company, with marble floors. When first opened, it functioned as the San Francisco's Bank of Italy's 13th branch till 1957. The building then became The City of Livermore's City Hall from 1957 to 1978. The building later became Bank of America's thirteenth branch till 1991. In 1991 the building was sold to the Seppala family, who updated the building, added and elevator and did seismic updates. Since 1963 the building has housed The Independent, a newspaper that serving the cities of Livermore, Dublin, Pleasanton and Sunol. A marker was placed on the building in July 1987 by the Livermore Heritage Preservation Commission.

The Bank of Italy Building headquarters in San Francisco Financial District is also on the National Register of Historic Places. Bank of Italy Buildings in other California cities are also on the National Register of Historic Places: Bank of Italy (Fresno, California), Bank of Italy (Paso Robles, California), Bank of Italy Building (San Jose, California), Bank of Italy (Tracy, California), and Bank of Italy (Visalia, California).

== Physical description ==
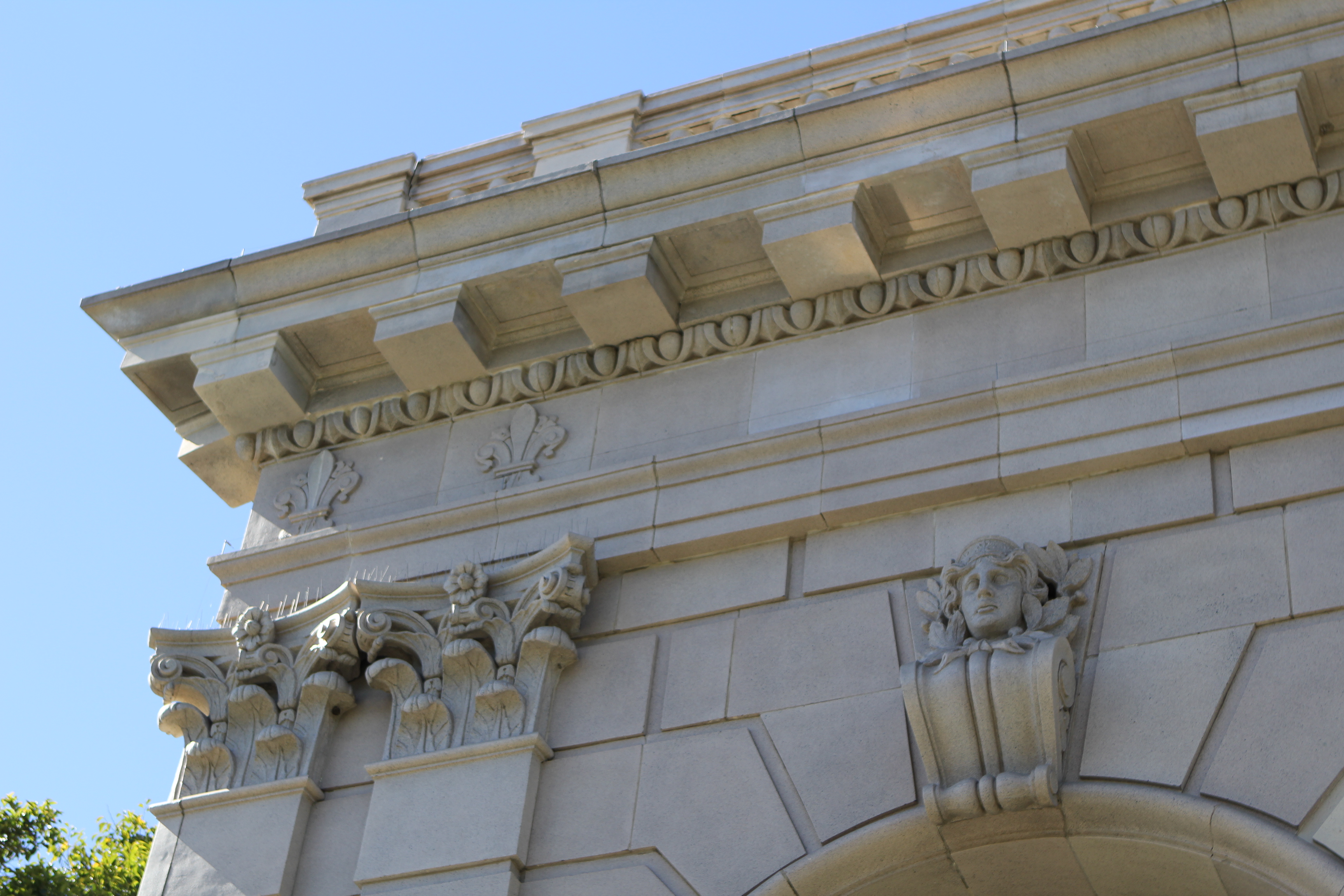
Top corner of the building

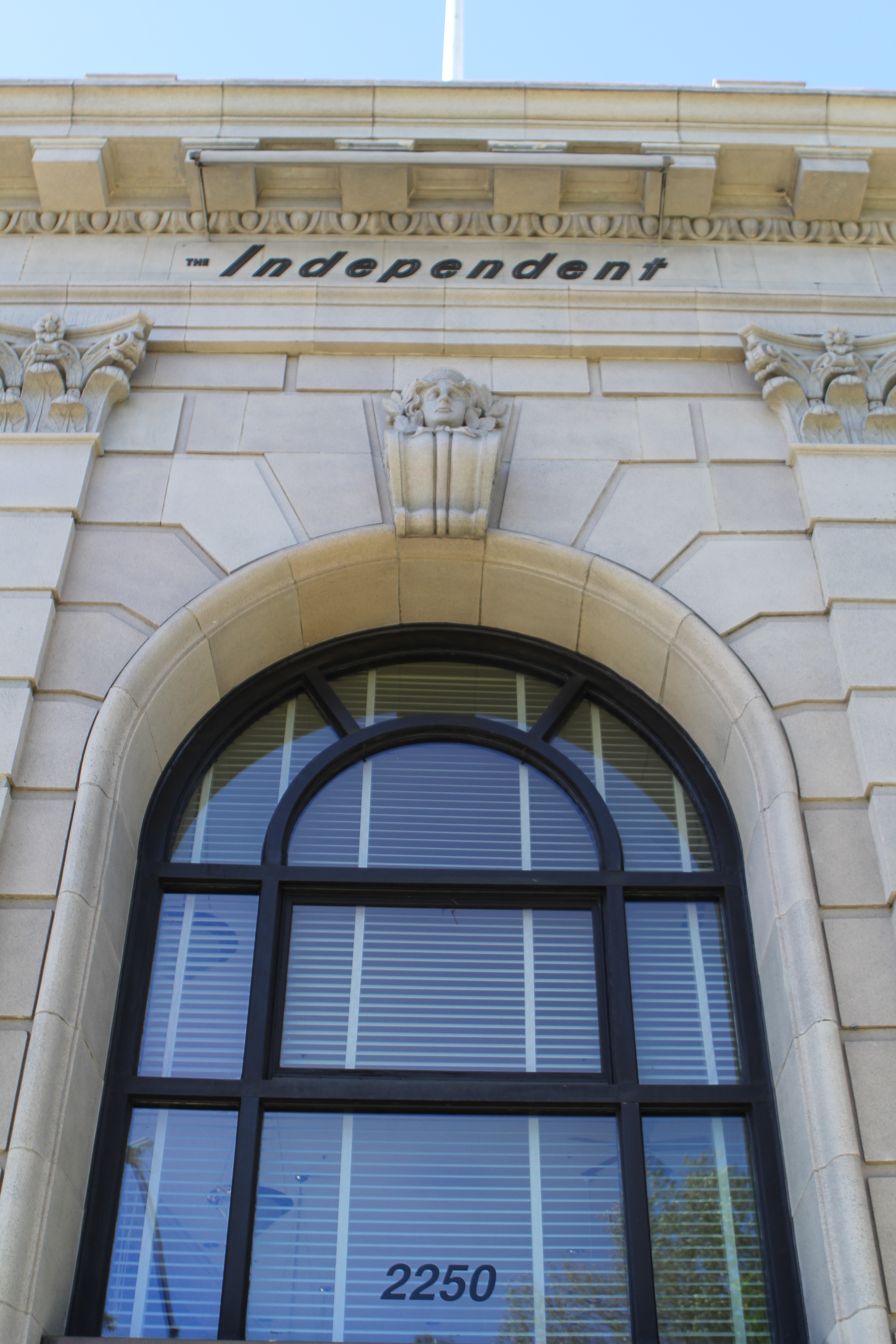
Front of the building

This building, designed in the "Renaissance Revival" style, stands at the intersection of First Street. The front-facing First Street spans about forty-seven feet in length and thirty-five feet in height. It features three semi-circular arched openings, each approximately eight feet wide and twenty-one feet high, symmetrically spaced along the facade. The central opening serves as the main entrance, featuring glazing above the door that matches the adjacent window openings. The flanking openings are fitted with wood sash windows containing clear glass. All openings are set back to create pronounced shadow effects, with window sills resting about four feet above the sidewalk on a solid stone-grade beam running around the building's perimeter.

The remaining portion of the facade consists of fourteen courses of rusticated cut stone, interspersed with single pilasters projecting three inches from the facade between each of the three main openings, and double pilasters at the building's corners. These pilasters are rusticated to harmonize with the facade wall and are adorned with intricately carved bases and Corinthian capitals. Each arched opening is crowned by a keystone bearing the sculpted likeness of a woman's head. Above the pilaster capitals, an architrave, taenia, and entablature embellished with relief sculptures of the French "Fleur-de-lis" flank the central name inscription "Bank of Italy." This ensemble is capped by a stone cornice featuring decorative elements like egg and dart motifs, simulated beam ends, or triglyphs, and a coffered soffit. A balustrade of turned balusters lines the roof perimeter, with square posts aligning with the pilasters below and topped by a simple rail. Positioned above the central arched opening on the roof is a white-painted flagpole.

Facing South Livermore Avenue, the facade mirrors that of First Street, measuring approximately sixty-three feet long and thirty-five feet high. It replicates the fenestration of the First Street facade but features four arched window openings instead of a doorway, with no flagpole atop the roof. The remaining two facades abut adjacent buildings and lack ornamentation. Despite the passage of time, the exterior of the building remains largely unchanged from its original design.

== Significance ==
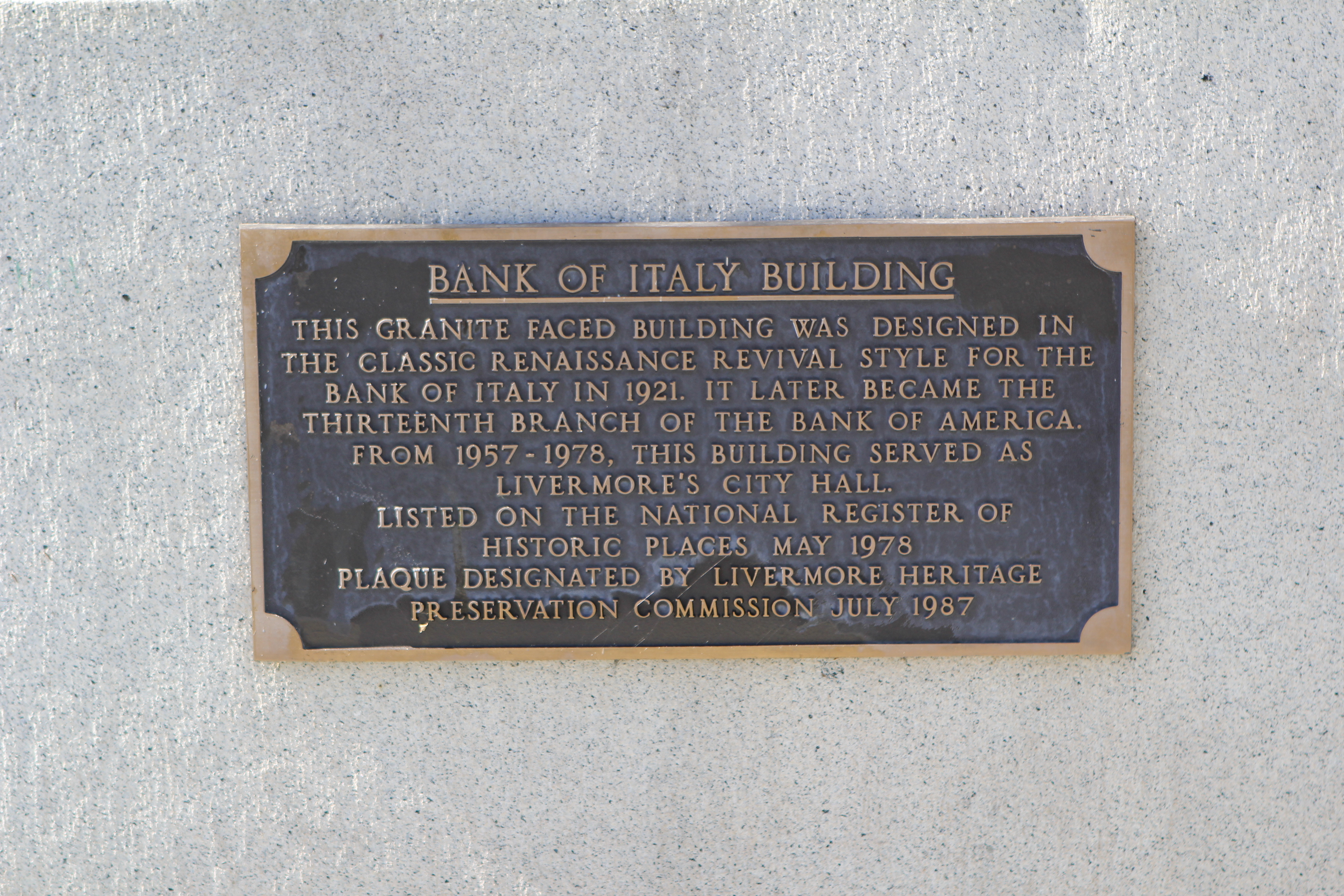
Historic Plaque on outside wall

The Livermore City Council officially recognized the building as a historical structure on December 12, 1977, in accordance with Chapter 11 of Sections 1 and 2 of Ordinance 905, adopted on December 13, 1976, and Ordinance 906, adopted on December 20, 1976.

Alfred J. Storm was commissioned by the Bank of Italy on May 17, 1921, to construct the building, intended to serve as the 13th branch of what is now known as the Bank of America, the world's largest banking system. Throughout construction, the Bank of Italy temporarily operated out of adjacent offices on Lizzie Street, now S. Livermore Ave.

The branch officially opened on January 3, 1922, under the management of Charles Arnette Smith. Among the first customers were Lloyd Henry Lassen and Zelda Hazel Lassen, prominent local farmers. The local Chamber of Commerce hosted a reception and dinner on the opening evening, with Mr. Thomas W. Norris, President of the competing First National Branch of Livermore, serving as the Toastmaster.

The City of Livermore purchased the building for use as City Hall on August 28, 1957. Over the ensuing three decades, Livermore's population swelled from 12,000 to over 48,000 residents. Designated as "City Hall" during this period of substantial growth, the building has been central to the city's governance. However, due to expanding needs, Livermore will soon transition to a newly constructed City Hall Center.

Recognized as a landmark, the granite-faced building holds significance not only for its historical and architectural merits but also for its position across from other historical structures of similar era and style within Livermore's center.

Architecturally notable as a Second Renaissance Revival bank building from the early 20th century, the Bank of Italy stands as a prime example of neoclassical architecture that adorned California's townscape during that period.

== See also ==
- Bank of Italy (disambiguation)
- Bank of America History
- National Register of Historic Places listings in Alameda County, California
