= Henry A. Minton =

American architect

Henry Anthony Minton Sr.
- Born: January 12, 1883
- Died: February 3, 1948 (aged 65); San Francisco, California
- Education: Boston Latin School, Harvard University
- Alma mater: Harvard University
- Spouse: Julia Gallegos

Henry Anthony Minton Sr. (1883–1948) was an American architect based in San Francisco who designed a number of buildings, primarily in the San Francisco Bay Area.

== Career ==
After graduating from Harvard University with an S.B. in architecture in 1905, Minton joined the office of Kendall, Taylor and Stephens in Boston. Within a year, he moved to San Francisco following the 1906 San Francisco Earthquake. As he wrote in 1925, "The San Francisco earthquake resulted in the publication in the newspapers of the crying need of architects in San Francisco. After due deliberation of at least six out of the ten hours granted to applicants, I became one of the party of twenty argonauts who left Boston for the West, and here I have remained." In San Francisco, Minton joined the firm of Dodge and Dolliver as draftsman and later became an architect for the City of San Francisco Department of Public Works.

He married Julia Gallegos, daughter of Juan Gallegos, who at one time had the largest winery in California in Mission San José.

He left the Department of Public Works in about 1913 to found his own practice where he worked until his death in 1948. The practice was continued by his son, John G. Minton. Several of Minton's early works were in the Washington Township that included Mission San José, Niles, and Irvington.

The architectural records and papers from Henry A. Minton and John G. Minton are archived at the Avery Architecture and Fine Arts Library at Columbia University. There are about 446 California projects in the archives with several out of state.

== Works ==
Two of Minton's most important clients were the Bank of Italy (now Bank of America) and the Archdiocese of San Francisco. Additional buildings designed by Minton include (all in California):

- Alterations to Residence for Joseph Shinn, Fremont (1917)
- M.V. Perry Residence, Fremont (1917)
- Hirsch Garage, Fremont (1917)
- Frank Albert Leal Theater and Office Building, Fremont, 1923
- Bank of Italy office, San Jose (1925), NRHP-listed
- Bank of Italy Branch, Salinas (1927)
- Bank of Italy Building, San Francisco (1927)
- Bank of Italy Branch, Merced (1928), NRHP-listed
- Saint Brigid's Church Convent, San Francisco (1930)
- Bank of Italy Branch, San Mateo (1931)

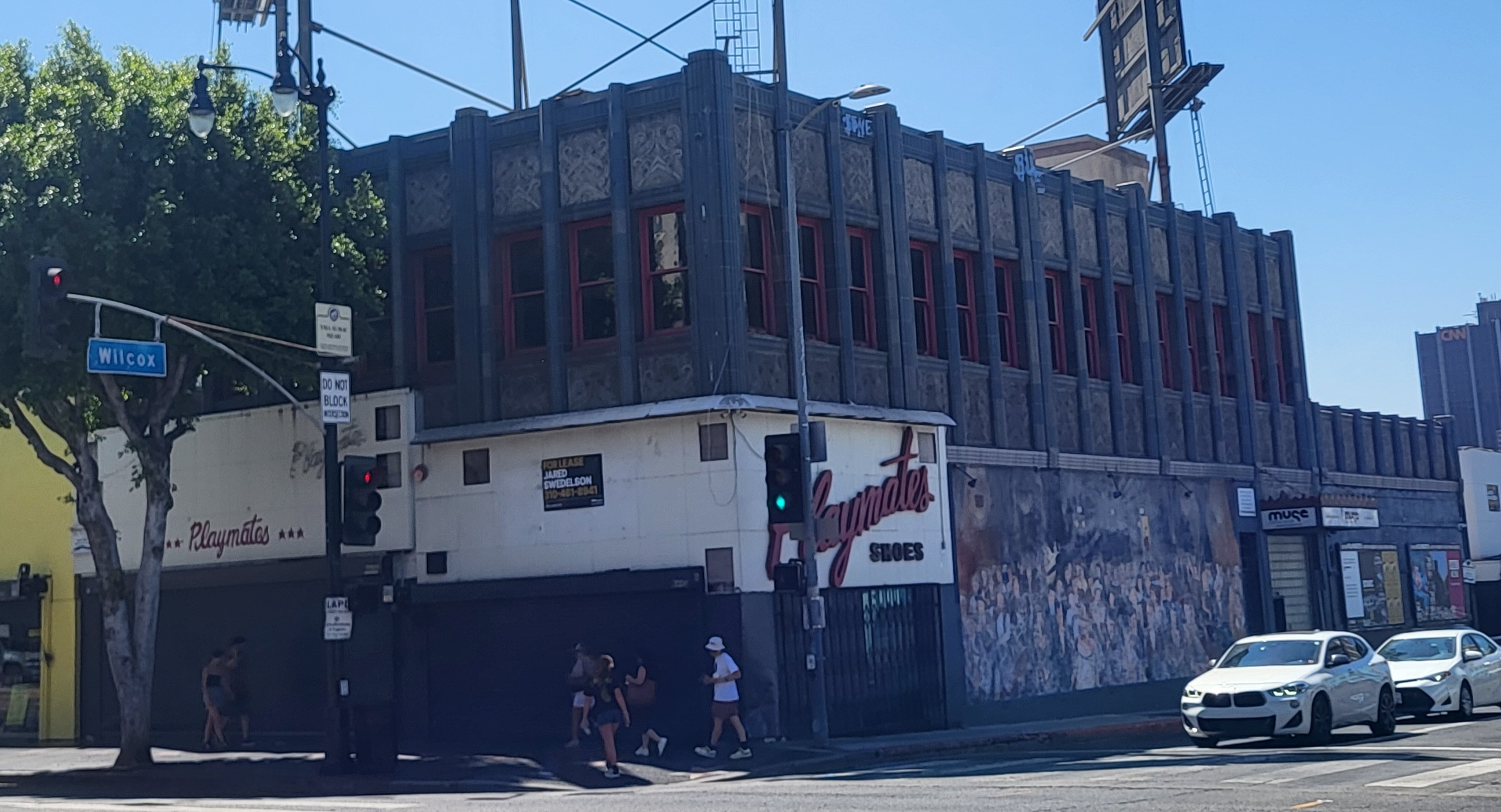
Attie Building

- Attie Building, Los Angeles (1931), NRHP-listed
- René C. Davidson Courthouse, Oakland (1934)
- Cathedral of the Annunciation, Stockton (1942)
- Cobb House, Alameda
- Liberty Bank Building, San Francisco
- Moccasin Creek Power House, Moccasin Drawings in the Avery Archives.
- Saint Aloysius Church, Palo Alto
- Saint Cecelia's Church Parochial Residence, San Francisco
- J. W. Speyer House, Oakland
- Superior Court of California Courthouse #4, Oakland
