= The Independent (Livermore) =

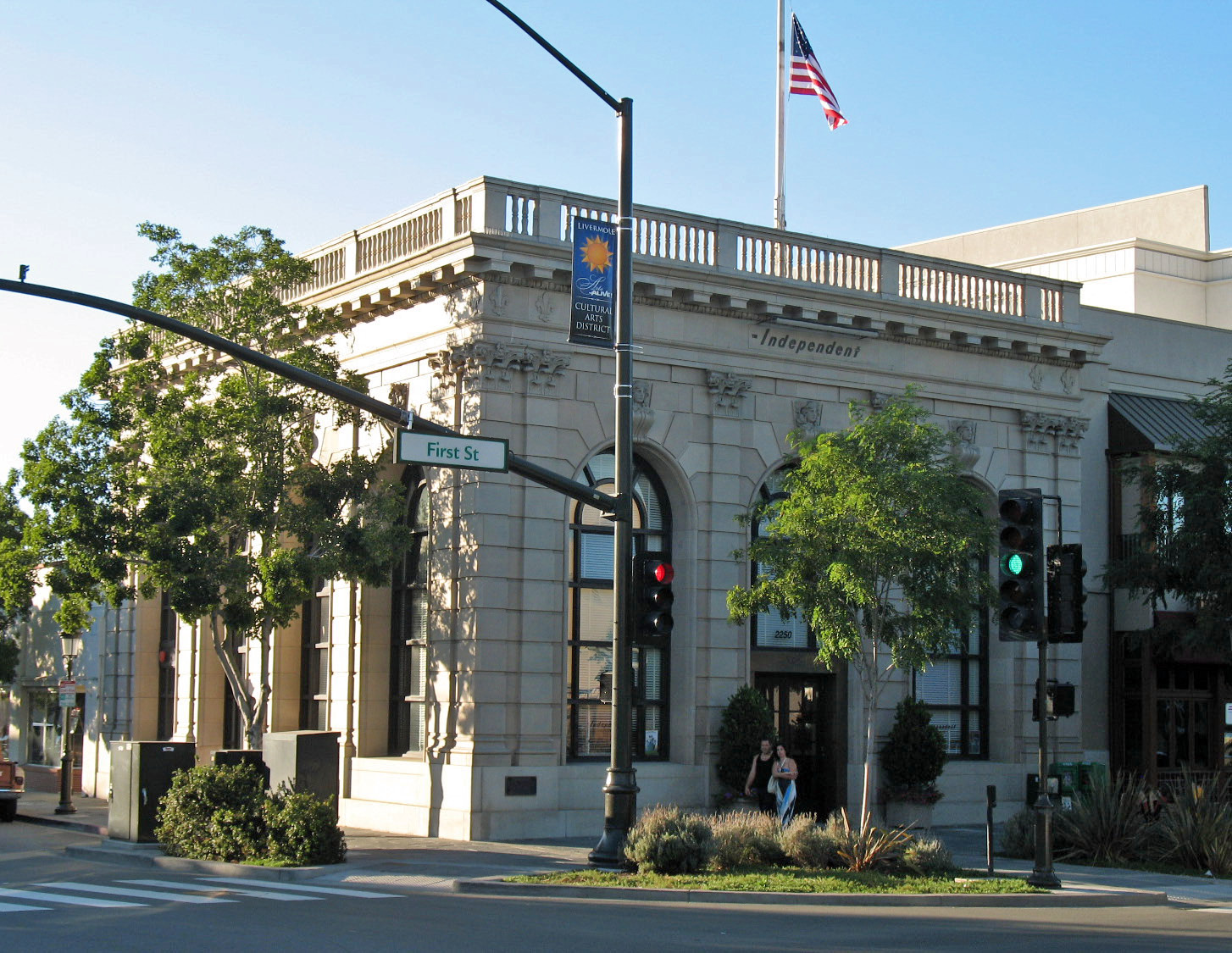
- The Independent is based in the Bank of Italy building
- Type: Alternative Weekly
- Publisher: Joan Seppala
- Editor: Aly Brown
- Photo editor: Doug Jorgensen
- Founded: September 1963; 62 years ago
- Language: English
- Headquarters: 2250 First Street, Livermore, California 94550
- City: Livermore, California
- Country: United States
- OCLC number: 30961440
- Website: independentnews.com

The Independent is a weekly newspaper in Livermore, California, United States, established in 1963. The paper is offered to residents and businesses in Livermore, Pleasanton, Dublin, and Sunol for free.

== History ==
=== Founding ===
The first issue of the Independent was printed on September 21, 1963, in the midst of a 100-degree Indian summer. Among other stories it featured an editorial describing the paper's principles, another promoting a local lecture series, some scathing stories on the activities of local politicians behind closed doors, and a few photographs.

=== 1972 Proposition B support ===
In 1972, The Independent came out in support of Proposition B, a local measure titled the Save All Valley Environment Initiative (SAVE) designed to curb local development in the region. Effectively, it blocked housing projects in Pleasanton and Livermore if there was insufficient school, water, or sewer capacity in either city. It also endorsed local politicians who supported the initiative. While the proposition was successful, the paper was boycotted by major advertisers as a result of the paper's support, which turned the paper into a weekly rather than thrice-weekly publication. According to Joan Seppala, the paper received donations which helped it to keep going.

== See also ==
- Bank of Italy (Livermore, California)
