= Los Angeles Investment Company =

Defunct real estate development company based in Los Angeles

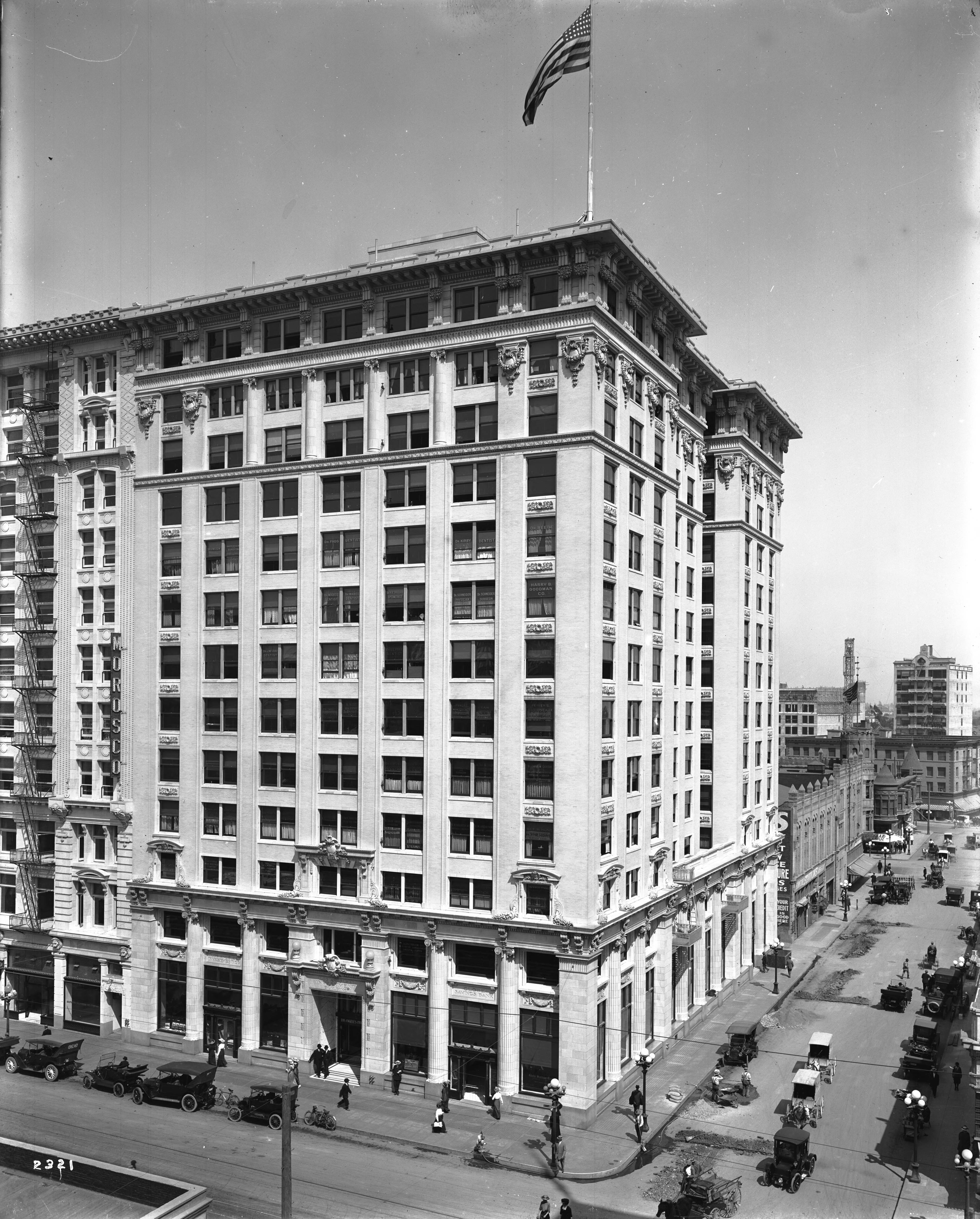
Chapman Building, originally the Los Angeles Investment Company Building, at the northeast corner of 8th and Broadway in the Historic Core of Downtown Los Angeles

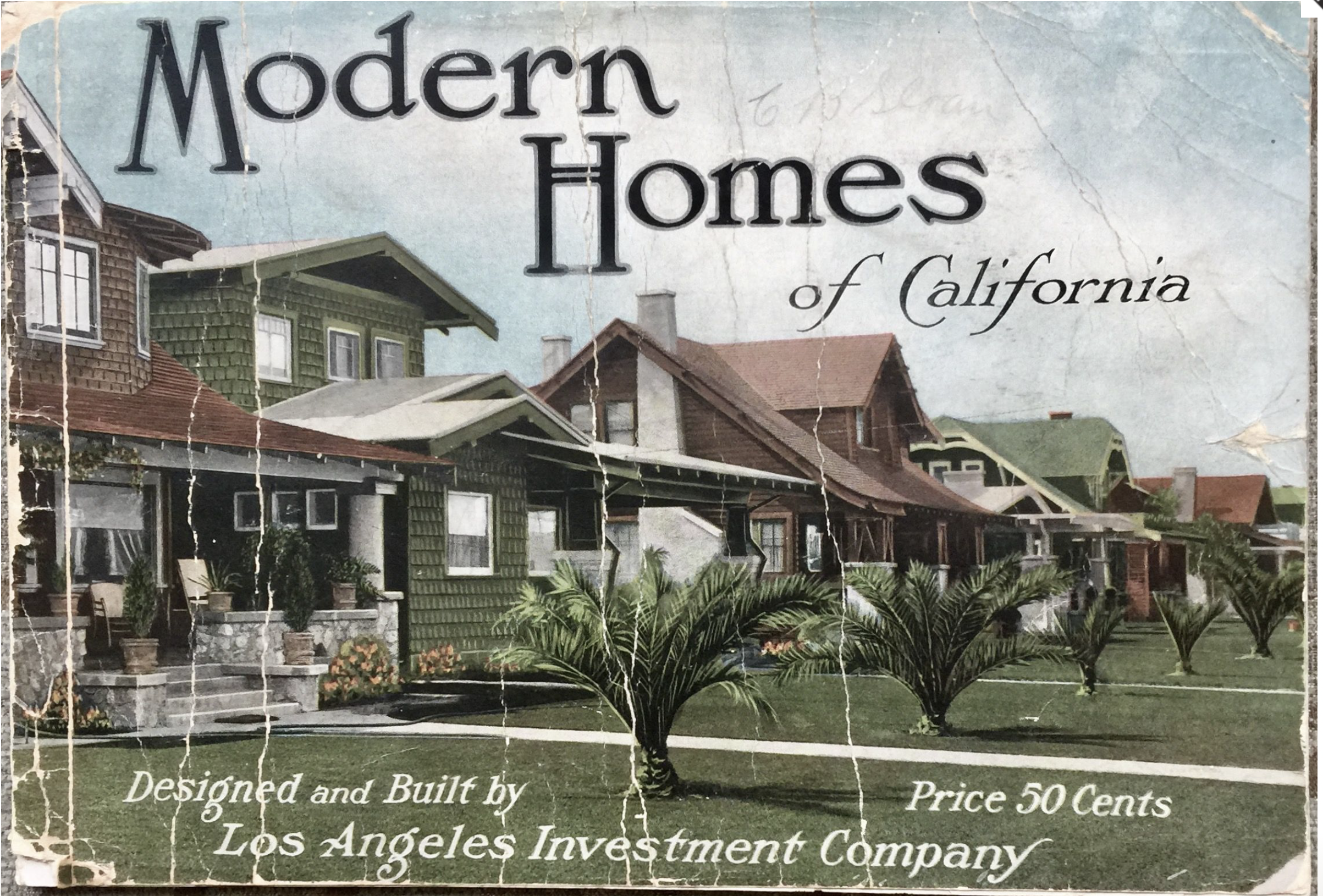
Cover of Modern Homes of California (1913)

The Los Angeles Investment Company (LAIC) was a real estate development company in Southern California. Founded in 1899 by Charles Abbott Elder and his partners, the LAIC quickly established itself as a significant player in real estate development across the region. Elder envisioned an approach that made homeownership accessible to middle-class individuals, relying on a model where small investors could pool funds to support large-scale property development. By promoting installment payment options, LAIC allowed everyday citizens to become homeowners, especially during a period of rapid growth in Los Angeles.

The company gained prominence by designing and constructing affordable "Modernized Bungalows", which were well-suited to the local climate. These homes featured in the LAIC’s publication, Modern Homes of California, which showcased architectural designs and construction details, appealing to families looking for cost-effective housing solutions.

LAIC’s ambitious projects were supported by its subsidiary, the Elder Building Material Company, which provided necessary construction materials for the development of entire neighborhoods. Through this business model, the LAIC expanded quickly, becoming one of the largest cooperative development companies in the region by the early 1910s.

Despite their early success, the LAIC faced financial difficulties in the mid-1910s, culminating in the sale of their iconic headquarters building at Eighth and Broadway in Los Angeles to Charles C. Chapman in 1920. Nonetheless, the company left a lasting impact on the urban landscape of Los Angeles by helping shape the city’s suburban housing market and contributing to the spread of bungalow-style homes.

In 1913, buoyed by the completion of the Los Angeles Aqueduct, the LAIC started an ambitious real estate project in Baldwin Hills, part of land previously owned by Elias J. "Lucky" Baldwin. Elder envisioned creating one of the largest and most impressive residential developments in Los Angeles, consisting of thousands of homes, parks, and schools, with an estimated investment of $15 million in improvements.

However, financial difficulties soon arose. Despite his optimistic public statements, Elder's ventures began to falter, leading to a suspension of dividends and declining stock values. By the end of 1913, the LAIC was reorganized, with a new management team taking over the company. Elder and several associates faced federal charges for mail fraud related to their solicitation of investments, and he was eventually convicted and served time in prison.

== See also ==
- Los Angeles Investment Company headquarters building, now the Chapman Building
- Ernest McConnell, in-house architect for the LAIC
