= Chapman Building =

Historic building in Los Angeles, US

- U.S. Historic district – Contributing property
- Los Angeles Historic-Cultural Monument
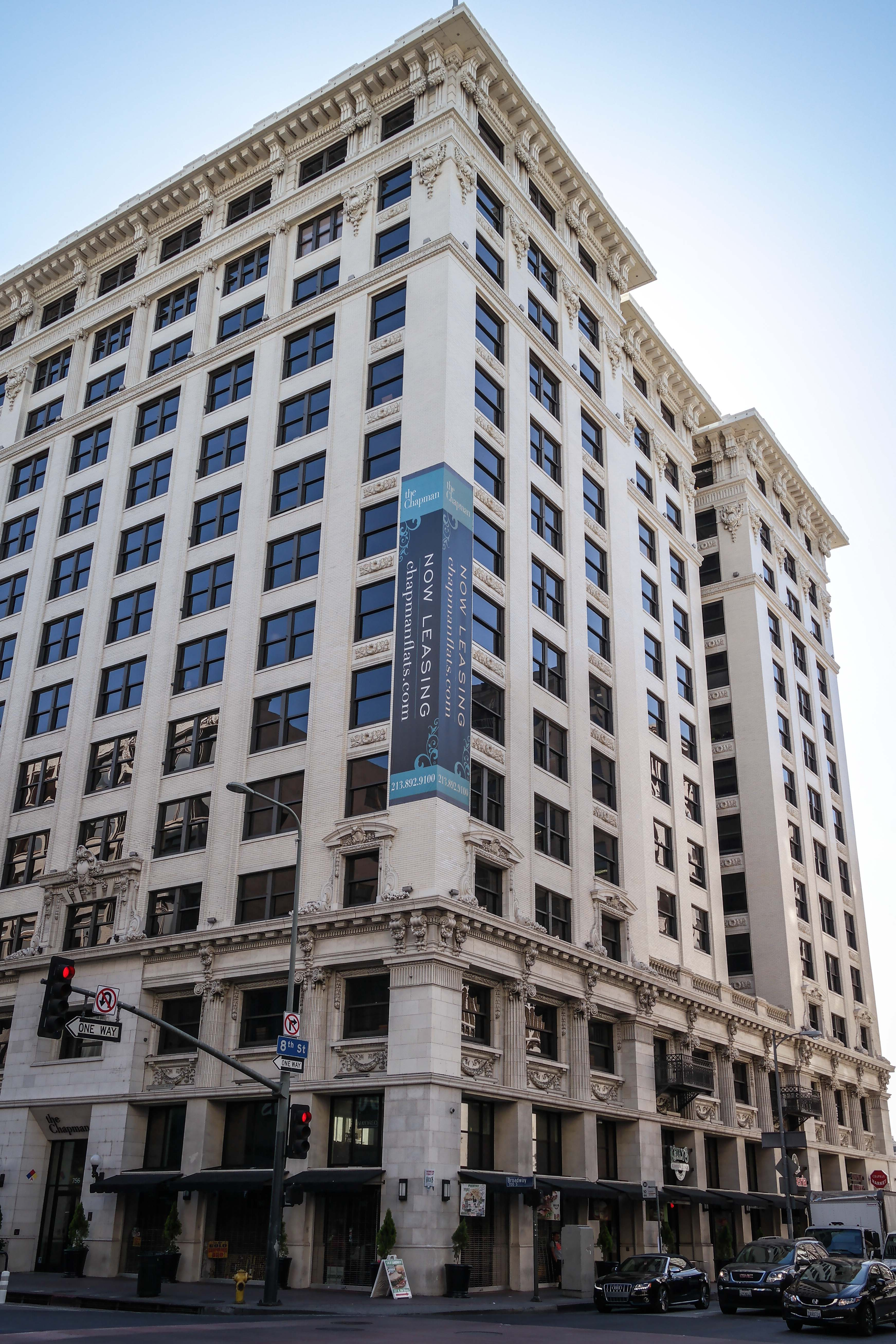
- The building in 2014

- Location within the Los Angeles metropolitan area
- Location: 756 S. Broadway and 227 W. 8th Street, Los Angeles, California
- Coordinates: 34°02′38″N 118°15′16″W
- Built: 1911-1913
- Architect: Ernest McConnell
- Architectural style: Beaux Arts
- Part of: Broadway Theater and Commercial District (ID79000484)
- LAHCM No.: 899

Significant dates
- Designated CP: May 9, 1979
- Designated LAHCM: December 5, 2007

Chapman Building, also known as Los Angeles Investment Company Building, Charles C. Chapman Building, The Chapman, and Chapman Flats, is a historic thirteen-story highrise located at 756 S. Broadway and 227 W. 8th Street in the Broadway Theater District in the historic core of downtown Los Angeles.

== History ==
Chapman Building, originally named Los Angeles Investment Company Building after the Los Angeles Investment Company who built the building, was designed by in-house architect Ernest McConnell and built between 1911 and 1913. In 1913, Globe Savings Bank moved its headquarters to the building.

Charles Chapman, the former mayor of Fullerton and first chairman of the board for Bank of America, bought Chapman Building for $1.6 million in 1920 ($25.7 million in 2025) and then headquartered Bank of America there.

In 1979, the Broadway Theater and Commercial District was added to the National Register of Historic Places, with Chapman Building listed as a contributing property in the district. In 2007, the building was listed as Los Angeles Historic Cultural Monument #899.

The building was converted to a 168-unit condominium complex in 2007, but before the condos were sold they were switched to for-lease apartments. The entire project took more than two years and $30 million ($47.9 million in 2025) to complete.

== Architecture and design ==
Chapman Building is made of steel-framed concrete with a terra cotta and brick facade. The building is divided into four sections, three of which are above the bottom two stories, and features a Beaux Arts design that includes ionic fluted columns, heavy cornice, and ornamental bands and moldings.

Chapman Building's interior features marble staircases and expansive hallways highlighted by tiled floors, marble walls, and metal doors.

== See also ==
- List of contributing properties in the Broadway Theater and Commercial District
- List of Los Angeles Historic-Cultural Monuments in Downtown Los Angeles
