= National Trust and Savings Association =

Designation used by national banks in the United States

National Trust and Savings Association (NT&SA) is a designation used by national banks in the United States to denote their national charter. It is significantly less popular than the standard designation National Association (N.A.). Notably, it was used until 1998 by Bank of America NT&SA, the only major bank to utilize the designation. It was also construed to denote the character of a savings and loan association, with a focus on home mortgages and savings accounts.
