= Charles Chapman (mayor) =

First mayor of Fullerton, California, US

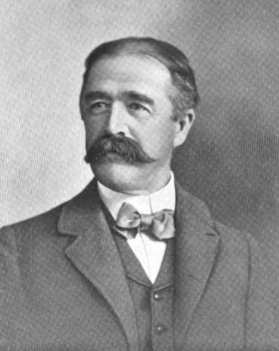

Mayor of Fullerton, California
- In office 1904–1906

Personal details
- Born: Charles Clarke Chapman; July 2, 1853; Macomb, Illinois
- Died: April 5, 1944 (aged 90); Fullerton, California
- Political party: Republican
- Spouses: Lizzie Pearson (m. 1884; died 1894) Clara Irvin (m. 1898)
- Occupation: Businessman, politician

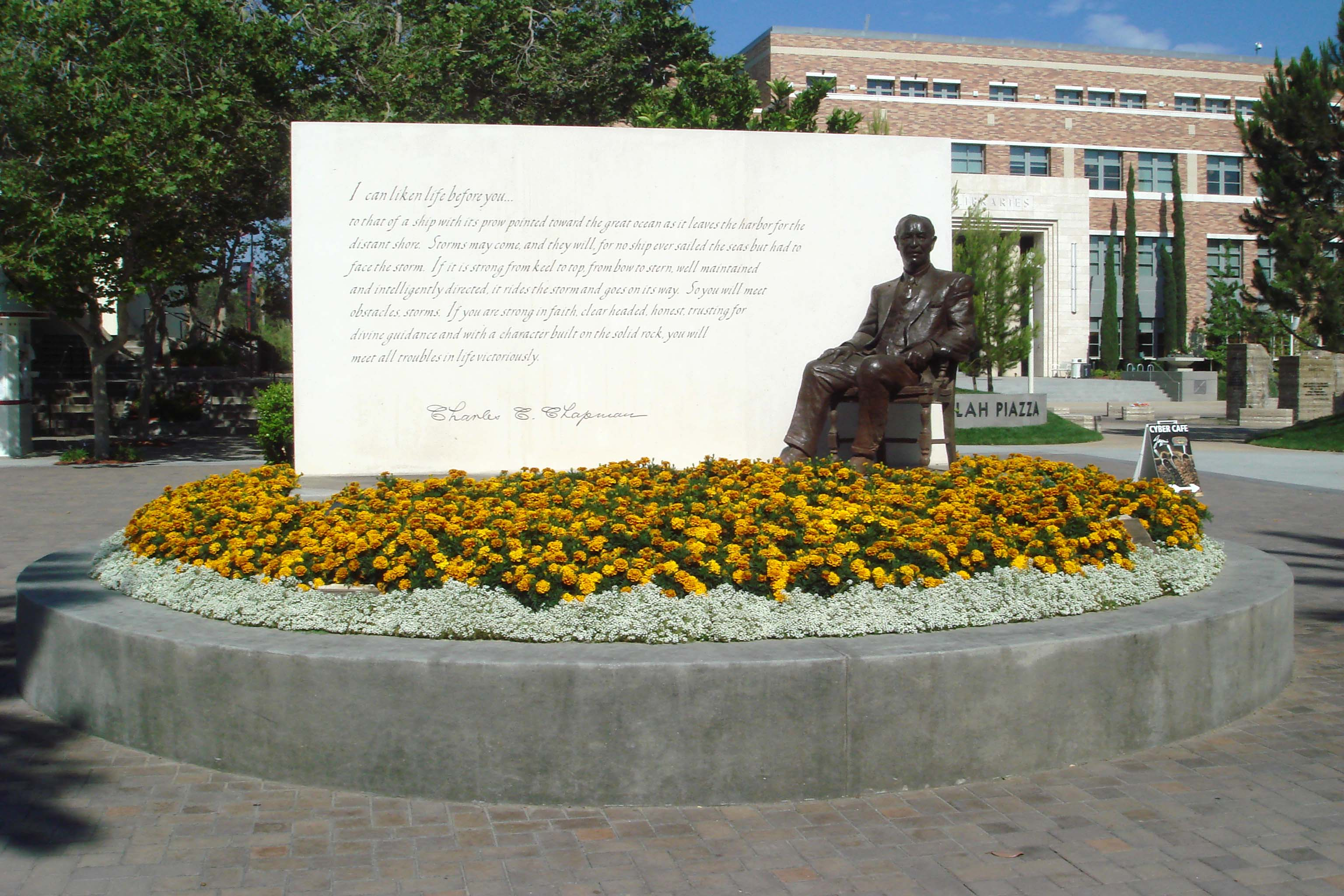
Sculpture of Charles C. Chapman by artist Raymond Persinger located at the entrance of Chapman University

Charles Clarke Chapman (July 2, 1853 – April 5, 1944) was the first mayor of Fullerton, California, and a relative of John Chapman, the legendary "Johnny Appleseed". He was a native of Illinois who had been a Chicago publisher before settling in Southern California.

Chapman was a supporter of the Disciples of Christ, who was a primary donor and fundraiser for California Christian College, which in 1934 changed its name to Chapman College, and is now Chapman University, in his honor.

While some believe Chapman Avenue, a major Orange County thoroughfare, is also named in his honor, the street is actually named after the unrelated Alfred Chapman, co-founder of the city of Orange.

== Chapman's citrus empire ==
=== Early involvement in the California citrus industry ===
Charles Chapman was born in Macomb, Illinois on July 2, 1853.

In 1894, Chapman moved from the Midwest to Los Angeles. There, he bought an orange grove in Placentia as a hobby; this was his first foray into the citrus business. Chapman's innovation in regards to oranges contributed to his success in the industry. He had his workers wear gloves and use rounded-tipped clippers to prevent damage to the fruits' rinds, thus reducing the likelihood of spoilage. His innovations made him successful within the citrus industry, and he was nicknamed the "Orange King".

Concerned as to how his product would compete with European oranges from Spain and Italy, in 1906 he and other citrus growers successfully lobbied the House Ways and Means Committee for a one-cent-per-pound tariff on European oranges.

=== Valencia oranges ===
Chapman found that Valencia oranges could be left on the trees for an extra six months after ripening. This allowed him to ship oranges to customers in months that were previously thought to be out of season for oranges. This was in contrast to the more famous Washington navel oranges that dominated the citrus business at the time. Valencia oranges grown in Orange County, at one time, made more profit than the oranges of any other location.

=== Use of fertilizers ===
While growing his business, Chapman experimented with different types of fertilizers to see which ones would yield the best orange crops. While Chapman was unsure about a fertilizer's ability to create better oranges than the more traditional method of growing oranges (i.e., plowing, irrigation, cultivation), he vowed to experiment with giving his oranges "plant food." He tested several different fertilizers: sheep manure, lime cake, bone meal, commercial fertilizers, and a combination of each. He found that there were no discernible quality differences between oranges in fertilized orchards versus traditional methods. He attributed these results to sufficient nutrients already being present in the soil, paired with proper farming techniques.

=== Marketing ===
Chapman firmly believed that the marketing of oranges should begin as soon as they were taken off the tree. In the packing houses, the oranges would be clean and handled properly, as too much fruit had been arriving in the markets in poor condition. According to Chapman, shipments sent to the markets should include only the very best oranges. Chapman also thought that orange brands should build up their reputations and establish trade in specific markets. instead of pandering to many different markets, as brand loyalty mattered significantly. He also believed in creating demand for oranges by advertising them as delicious, healthful items of luxury. In addition to this, Chapman built his brand's popularity through his impressive crate label design. His "Old Mission" brand oranges' crate labels borrowed their name and imagery of Catholic monks and outdoor scenery from a famous novel at the time, Ramona by Helen Hunt Jackson.

== Politics ==
A Republican, Chapman was the first mayor of Fullerton, California, serving from 1904 to 1906.

== Business ==
Chapman was the first chairman of the board for Bank of America, and when he bought downtown Los Angeles's Chapman Building, he moved the bank headquarters into the building.

== Personal life ==
Chapman married Lizzie Pearson in Texas on October 23, 1884, and they had two children. She died in Los Angeles on September 19, 1894. He remarried, to Clara Irvin, on September 3, 1898.

He died at his ranch in Fullerton on April 5, 1944.

== Sources ==
- History page from the college
