= Bank of Italy, Merced =

- U.S. National Register of Historic Places
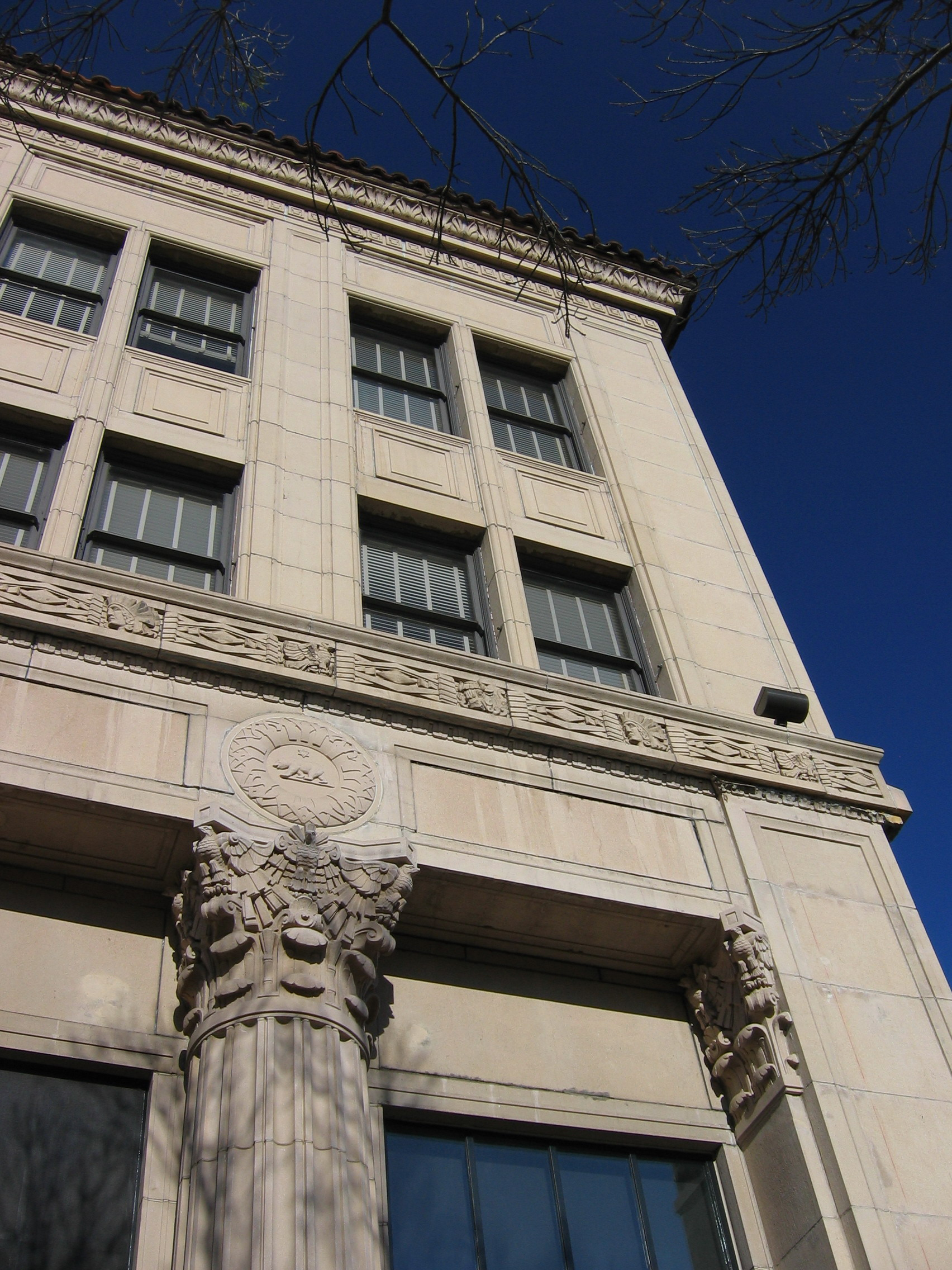
- The Bank of Italy facade

- Location within California Location within the United States
- Location: 501 W. Main St., Merced, California
- Coordinates: 37°18′6″N 120°28′58″W
- Area: 0.2 acres (0.081 ha)
- Built: 1928
- Architect: Henry Anthony Minton
- Architectural style: Classical Revival
- NRHP reference No.: 04001135
- Added to NRHP: October 12, 2004

The Bank of Italy is a historic bank building located at the intersection of Main and Canal Streets in Merced, California. Opened in 1928, the bank was Merced's branch of the Bank of Italy. Henry A. Minton designed the building in the Classical Revival style. The bank's design includes a flat, clay tile roof with terra cotta mansards and an ornamental cornice and frieze. Five Corinthian columns are situated on the building's Main Street facade, and seven pilasters face Canal Street. The first and second floors of the bank are separated by a decorative band of panels; the band features alternating square panels displaying an Indian head or an eagle separated by rectangular panels with a diamond design. The building's exterior is mostly faced in Travertine marble; the base is faced in granite, and parts of the first floor were covered with stucco in the 1950s.

The building is known locally as the "Mondo Building." From 2004 through 2019 the building was leased to UC Merced as administrative office space.

In 2019, the building was purchased by the Merced County Office of Education, which currently uses the building as a conference, event, meeting, and office space.
