= Bank of Italy (disambiguation) =

Bank of Italy is the Bank of Italy or Banca d'Italia, the central bank of Italy.

Or it may refer to:

- Bank of Italy (United States), a bank established in San Francisco, California and the forerunner of the Bank of America.

Or Bank of Italy or Bank of Italy Building may refer to individual bank buildings:

- Bank of Italy (Fresno, California), listed on the National Register of Historic Places in Fresno County, California
- Bank of Italy (Livermore, California), listed on the National Register of Historic Places in Alameda County, California
- Bank of Italy (Paso Robles, California), listed on the National Register of Historic Places in San Luis Obispo County, California
- Bank of Italy Building (San Francisco), California, a U.S. National Historic Landmark, listed on the National Register of Historic Places
- Bank of Italy Building (San Jose, California), a U.S. National Historic Landmark, listed on the National Register of Historic Places in Santa Clara County
- Bank of Italy (Tracy, California), listed on the National Register of Historic Places in San Joaquin County, California
- Bank of Italy (Visalia, California), listed on the National Register of Historic Places in Tulare County, California
