= Bank of Italy (Paso Robles, California) =

- U.S. National Register of Historic Places
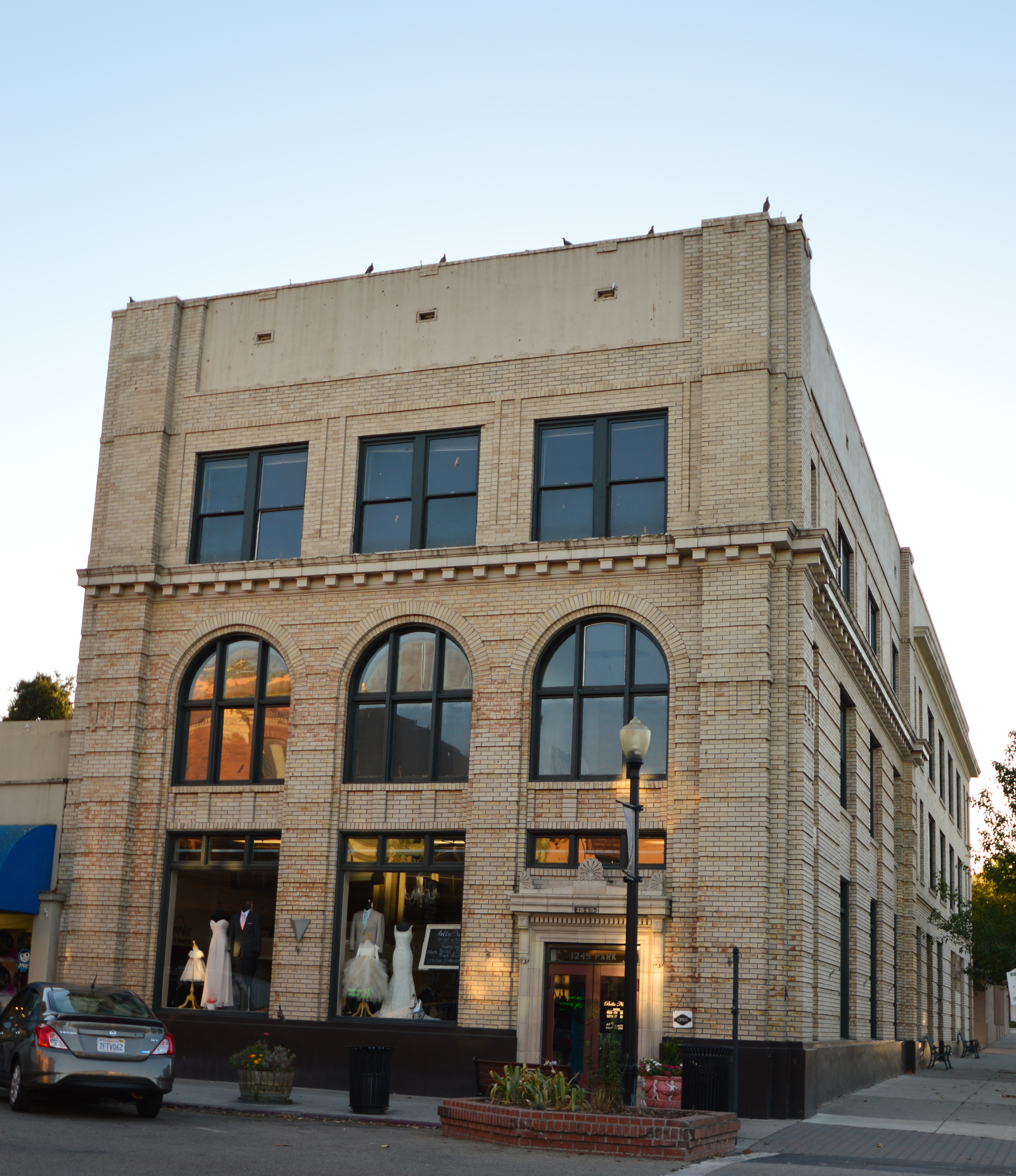

- Location within California Location within the United States
- Location: 1245 Park St., Paso Robles, California
- Coordinates: 35°37′39″N 120°41′21″W
- Area: less than one acre
- Built: 1921
- Architect: Nyberg, August
- Architectural style: Renaissance Revival
- NRHP reference No.: 98000245
- Added to NRHP: March 19, 1998

The Bank of Italy is a historic bank building located at 1245 Park St. in Paso Robles, California. The building was added to the National Register of Historic Places on March 19, 1998.

== Origin and design ==
Built in 1921, the three-story building was the tallest in Paso Robles. August Nyberg, the owner and architect of the bank, designed it in the Renaissance Revival style. The brick building's design features quoin-like corners, semicircular windows on the second floor with latticed glass and radiating brick borders, and recessed transoms.

== Historic uses ==
The Bank of Italy and Midland Light and Power moved into the building in 1922, and the bank purchased the building the following year. Bank of America acquired the Bank of Italy in 1930; from 1937 to 1958, the Bank of America branch in the building was the only bank in Paso Robles. The second floor of the building was used by various businesses, including several doctors, while the third floor held meetings for local fraternal organizations. Bank of America left the building in 1969.

== Modern usage ==
In 1992, art dealer Ali Salmanzadeh purchased the building and opened a gallery on the first floor; the California Department of Corrections uses the upper floors for office space.

== See also ==
- Bank of Italy (disambiguation)
- Bank of America History
