= Attie Building =

Building in Los Angeles, California, U.S.

- U.S. Historic district – Contributing property
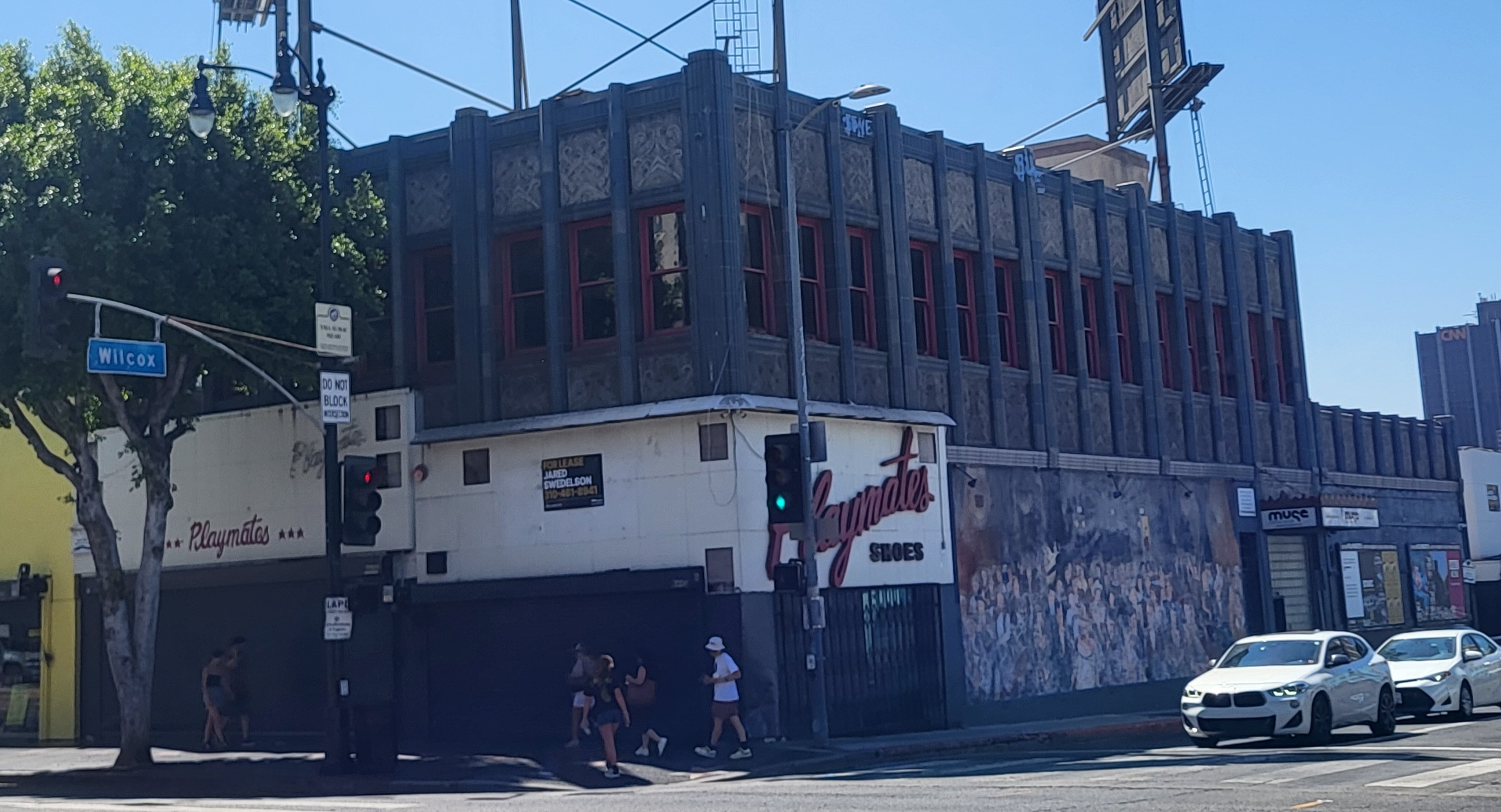
- The building in 2024

- Location within the Los Angeles metropolitan area
- Location: 6436 W. Hollywood Blvd., Hollywood, California
- Coordinates: 34.1012°N 118.3305°W
- Area: 9,000 square feet (840 m^{2})
- Built: 1931
- Architect: Henry A. Minton
- Architectural style: Art Deco
- Part of: Hollywood Boulevard Commercial and Entertainment District (ID85000704)
- Designated CP: April 4, 1985

Attie Building, also known as Playmates of Hollywood Building, is a historic two-story building located at 6436 W. Hollywood Boulevard in Hollywood, California. The building is notable for its second-floor Art Deco exterior as well as the 'You Are the Star' mural painted on its western-facing first floor exterior.

== History ==
Attie Building was built as a retail location by Henry A. Minton in 1931. The building is 9,000 square feet (840 m^{2}) in size.

In 1985, the Hollywood Boulevard Commercial and Entertainment District was added to the National Register of Historic Places, with Attie Building listed as a contributing property in the district.

In 2006, Attie Building was sold to an investment group. In 2019, the LeFrak Organization announced plans to preserve and restore the building as part of a larger construction project located beside it.

== Architecture and design ==
Attie Building features an elaborate second-story art deco design, with notable elements that include orange panels carved with flora and fauna designs, decorative tiles set off from the first story and roofline, and a series of piers that project above the roofline, with three sash windows recessed between each pier.

== 'You Are the Star' mural ==
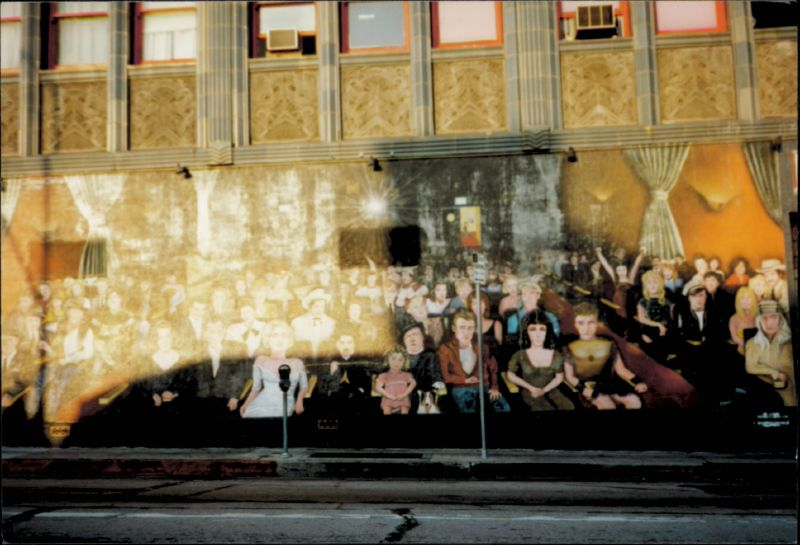
'You Are the Star' mural on the Attie Building, 2007

Attie building is famous for the 'You Are the Star' mural located on its western-facing first floor exterior. The mural, painted by Thomas Suriya in 1983, is twenty feet tall by thirty feet wide and depicts a movie theater in reverse, with famous actors including Richard Pryor, Laurel and Hardy, Humphrey Bogart, Lauren Bacall, James Dean, Marilyn Monroe, Woody Allen, Judy Garland, Mickey Rooney, Shirley Temple, W.C. Fields, John Wayne, James Cagney, Edward G. Robinson, Jack Lemmon, Bruce Lee, the Marx Brothers, and more, as well as characters such as Errol Flynn's Robin Hood, Charlie Chaplin's Tramp, Superman, Woody Woodpecker, Elizabeth Taylor's Cleopatra, Richard Burton's Marc Anthony, King Kong, Frankenstein, R2-D2, and more, all sitting in a theater, watching the viewer on screen.

== Filming location ==
Attie Building and its 'You Are the Star' mural have been featured in several films, including The Player, S.W.A.T., and La La Land.

== See also ==
- List of contributing properties in the Hollywood Boulevard Commercial and Entertainment District
