= Ernest McConnell =

American architect

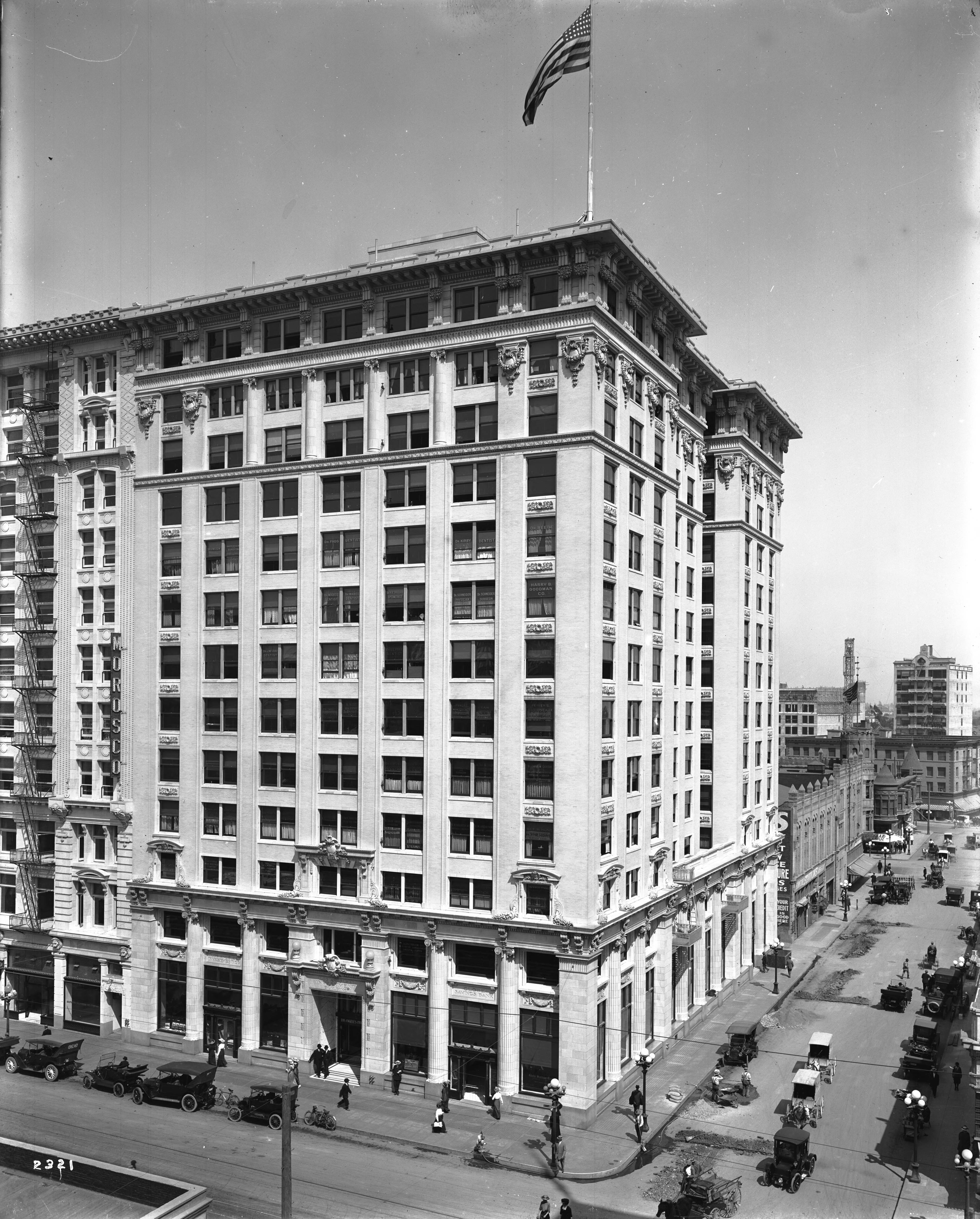
The Chapman Building at the northeast corner of 8th and Broadway in the Historic Core of Downtown Los Angeles

Ernest McConnell was an American architect who worked in-house for the Los Angeles Investment Company.

== Designs for homes ==
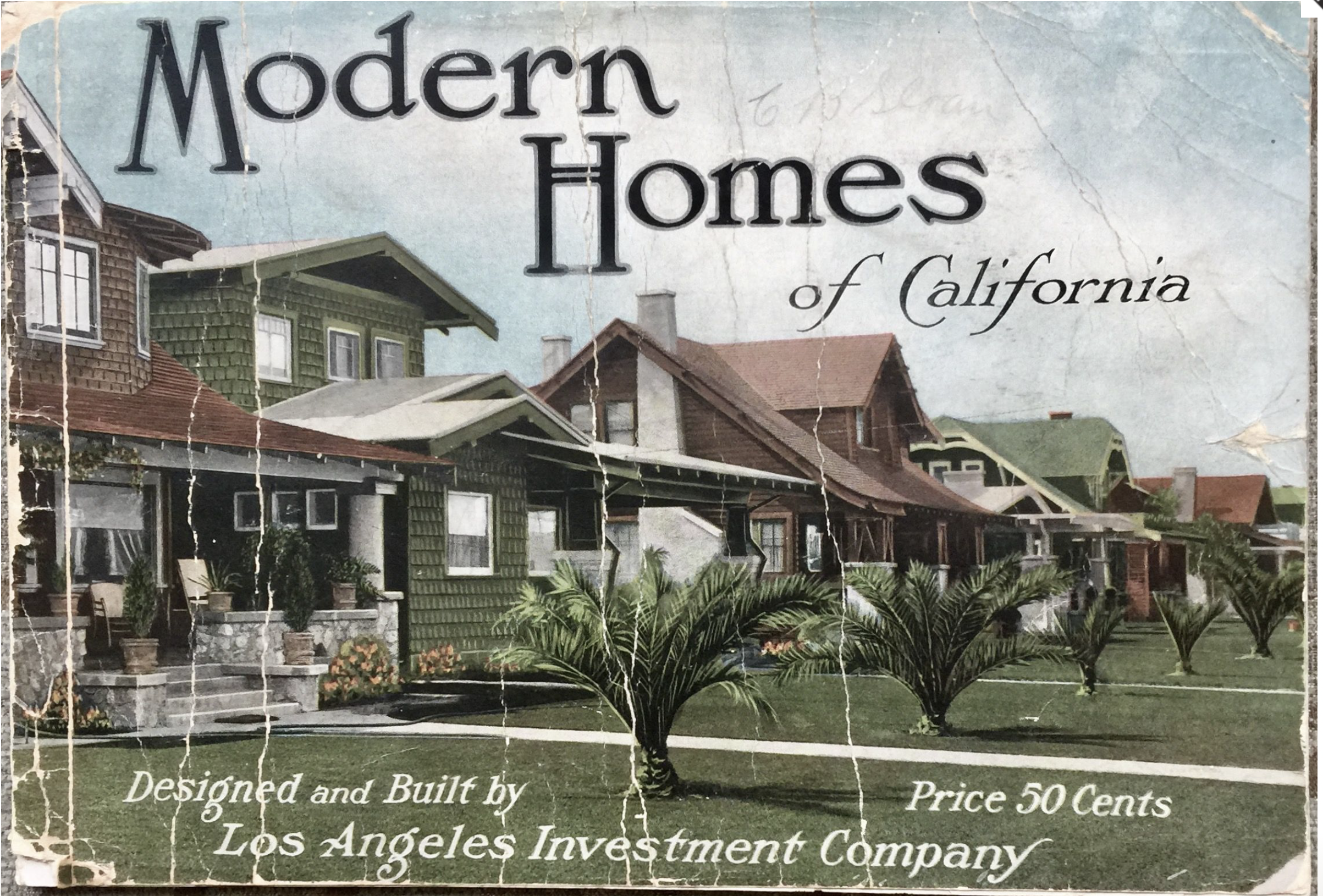
Cover of Modern Homes of California (1913)

McConnell also designed numerous Craftsman homes featured in a plan book that the Los Angeles Investment Co. published. The LAIC constructed many homes from those plans in various housing developments they built throughout Southern California.

McConnell oversaw the creation of all the designs in a 92-page catalog book that the Investment Co. released in 1912-3, titled Modern Homes of California. The book contained 77 architectural designs and photographs of mostly Arts and Crafts style bungalows across the Southland priced between $1500 and $5000, as well as 200 detailed illustrations of exterior and interior views, along with plans that provided accurate estimates for construction materials and labor costs.

== Other works ==
Ernest McConnell designed the Chapman Building, which was designated Los Angeles Historic-Cultural Monument No. 899 and a contributing property to the Broadway Theater and Commercial District.

== See also ==
- List of American architects
