= Bank of Italy (Fresno, California) =

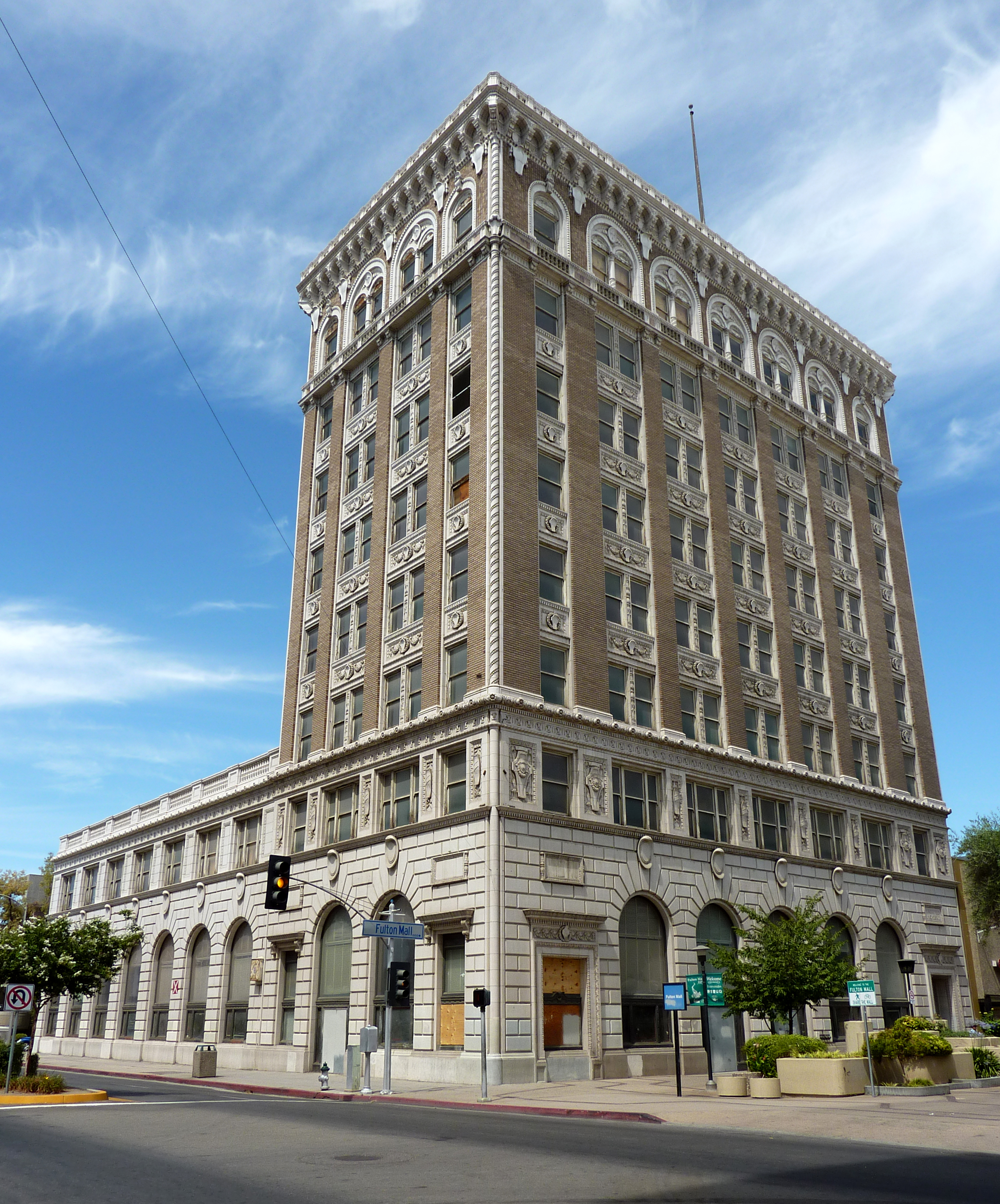
- Interactive map of the Bank of Italy area
- Former names: Bank of America

General information
- Type: Commercial offices
- Architectural style: Renaissance Revival
- Location: 1001 Fulton Mall; Fresno, California
- Coordinates: 36.7369°N 119.7947°W
- Construction started: 1917
- Completed: August 1918
- Owner: Penstar Group

Height
- Roof: 38 m (125 ft)

Technical details
- Floor count: 8

Design and construction
- Architects: Charles H. Franklin; R.F. Felchlin Company
- Bank of Italy
- U.S. National Register of Historic Places
- Built: 1917
- Architect: Richard Felchlin
- Architectural style: Renaissance
- NRHP reference No.: 82000963
- Added to NRHP: 1982

The Bank of Italy building is an historic 8-story, 38 m (125 ft) mid-rise in downtown Fresno, California. The building was completed in 1918 for the Bank of Italy, which later became the Bank of America. Its chief designer was Charles H. Franklin of the R.F. Felchlin Company. The completely vacant building is the ninth tallest in the city, and is listed on the U.S. National Register of Historic Places. The building was sold to the Penstar Group, a Fresno-based developer, in 2009.

== See also ==
- Bank of Italy (disambiguation)
- Bank of America History
