= Bank of America (1904–1998) =

American bank

- Formerly: Bank of Italy (1904–1930)
- Type: Public
- Traded as: NYSE: BA
- Industry: Banking
- Founded: October 17, 1904; 122 years ago
- Founder: Amadeo Giannini
- Defunct: September 30, 1998; 28 years ago
- Fate: Merged with NationsBank to become the Bank of America Corporation
- Parent: Transamerica Corporation

Bank of America, formerly known as the Bank of Italy, was founded in San Francisco, California, United States, on October 17, 1904, by Amadeo Pietro Giannini. By 1945, it had grown through a strategy of expanding branches to become the world's largest commercial bank with 493 branches in California and assets totaling $5 billion.

== History ==
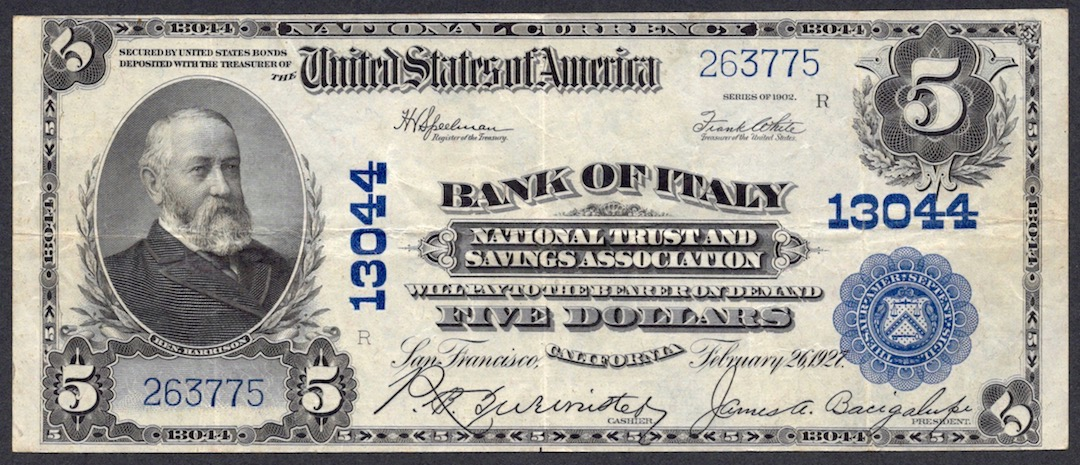
A U.S. National Bank Note issued by the Bank of Italy in 1927

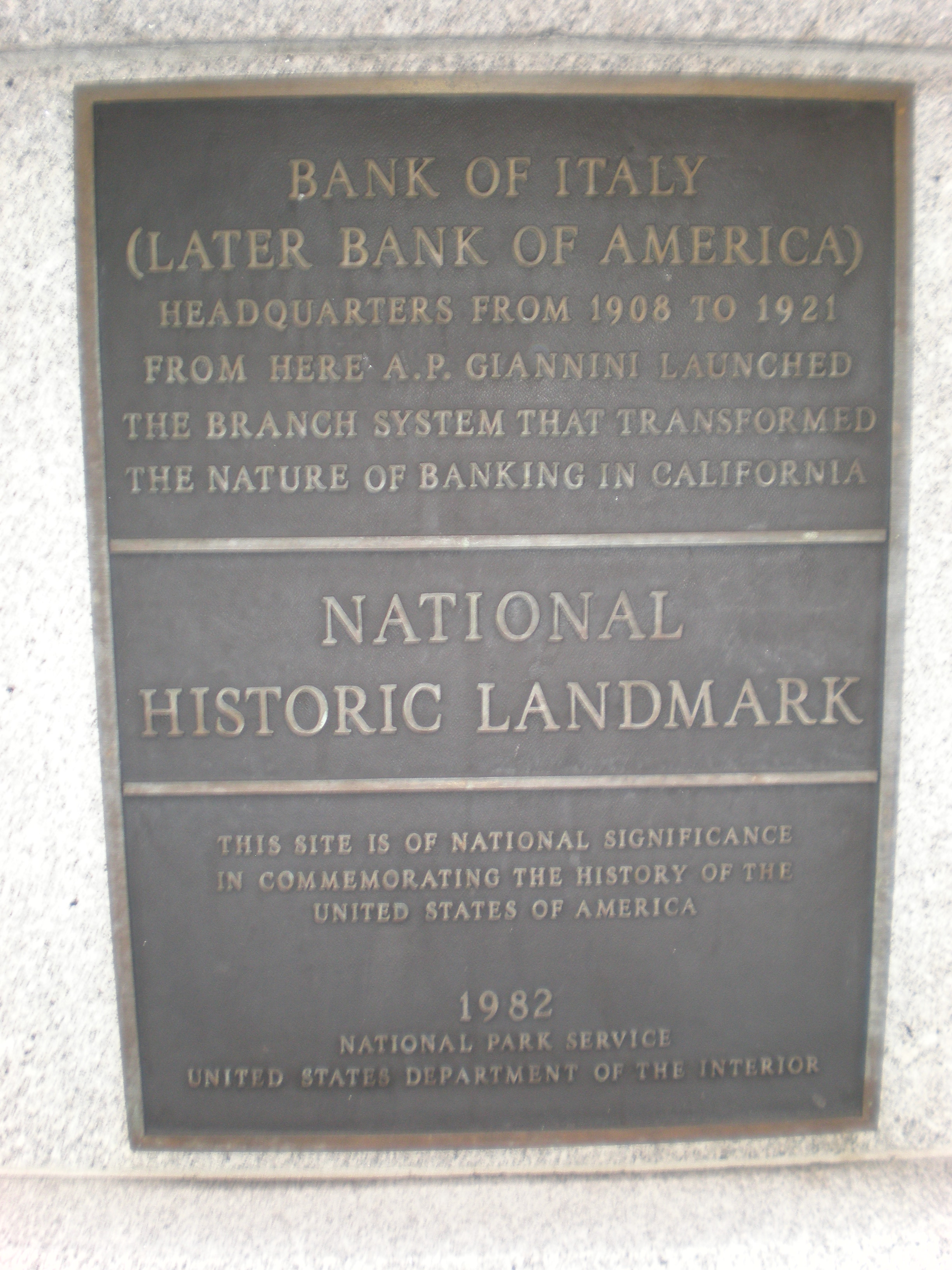
A marker at the Bank of Italy building at 550 Montgomery Street in San Francisco. This building was the headquarters of the Bank of Italy from 1908 to 1921, which later became Bank of America

The history of Bank of America began on October 17, 1904, when Amadeo Giannini founded the Bank of Italy in San Francisco.

The Bank of Italy was established to serve working class citizens of the area, especially Italian Americans living in San Francisco's North Beach neighborhood. The bank survived the San Francisco earthquake and fire of 1906, after Amadeo Pietro Giannini saw an approaching fire and relocated the bank assets to his San Mateo home using a horse drawn cart.

It was one of the first banks to offer loans to businesses to help rebuild the city.

The first location of the bank was in Jackson Square starting in 1904. The original building is no longer standing but the location is now the home of the Colombo Building (1909). The Bank of Italy building was opened at the corner of Clay and Montgomery streets in 1908 and later became a National Historic Landmark. Giannini had his office space in an open area on the first floor. In 1909, the bank began opening branches in other cities, beginning with San Jose.

It had 24 branches by 1918, at which time it was the first statewide branch banking system. That year, Bancitaly Corporation, was organized by A. P. Giannini, the largest stockholder of which was Stockholders Auxiliary Corporation. This company acquired the stocks of various banks located in New York City and certain foreign countries.

In 1922, the Bank of America, Los Angeles, was established with Giannini as a minority investor. The Bank of Italy merged with the smaller Bank of America, Los Angeles then led by Orra E. Monnette, in 1928, and consolidated with other bank holdings to create what would become the largest banking institution in the country. The following year, C. Ledyard Blair's New York City investment bank, Blair & Co., merged with Bank of America.

The Bank of Italy was renamed on November 3, 1930, to Bank of America National Trust and Savings Association, which was the only such designated bank in the United States at that time. Giannini and Monnette headed the resulting company, serving as co-chairs. Giannini continued to expand the bank until his death in 1949.

Bank of America merged with NationsBank of Charlotte, North Carolina, in 1998. While NationsBank was the nominal survivor, the merged bank took the Bank of America name and operates under the original charter for Bank of Italy. It also merged with Fleet Boston in April 1st, 2004, making it a bank with trillion dollar assets.

== In popular culture ==
Giannini's life and his many innovations in banking figure prominently in Jim McKelvey's, The Innovation Stack (Penguin, 2020).

Amadeo Giannini and the Bank of Italy were the basis for the classic 1932 Frank Capra movie American Madness, from the original screenplay Faith by Robert Riskin.

== See also ==
- Old Bank of America Building (San Jose, California) - Bank of Italy
- Bank of Italy, Merced
- Bank of Italy (Visalia, California)
- Bank of Italy (Tracy, California)
- Bank of Italy (Fresno, California)
- Bank of Italy - disambiguation to landmark buildings
- Banca d'America e d'Italia, sister bank
