= Bank of Italy Building (San Francisco) =

- U.S. National Register of Historic Places
- U.S. National Historic Landmark
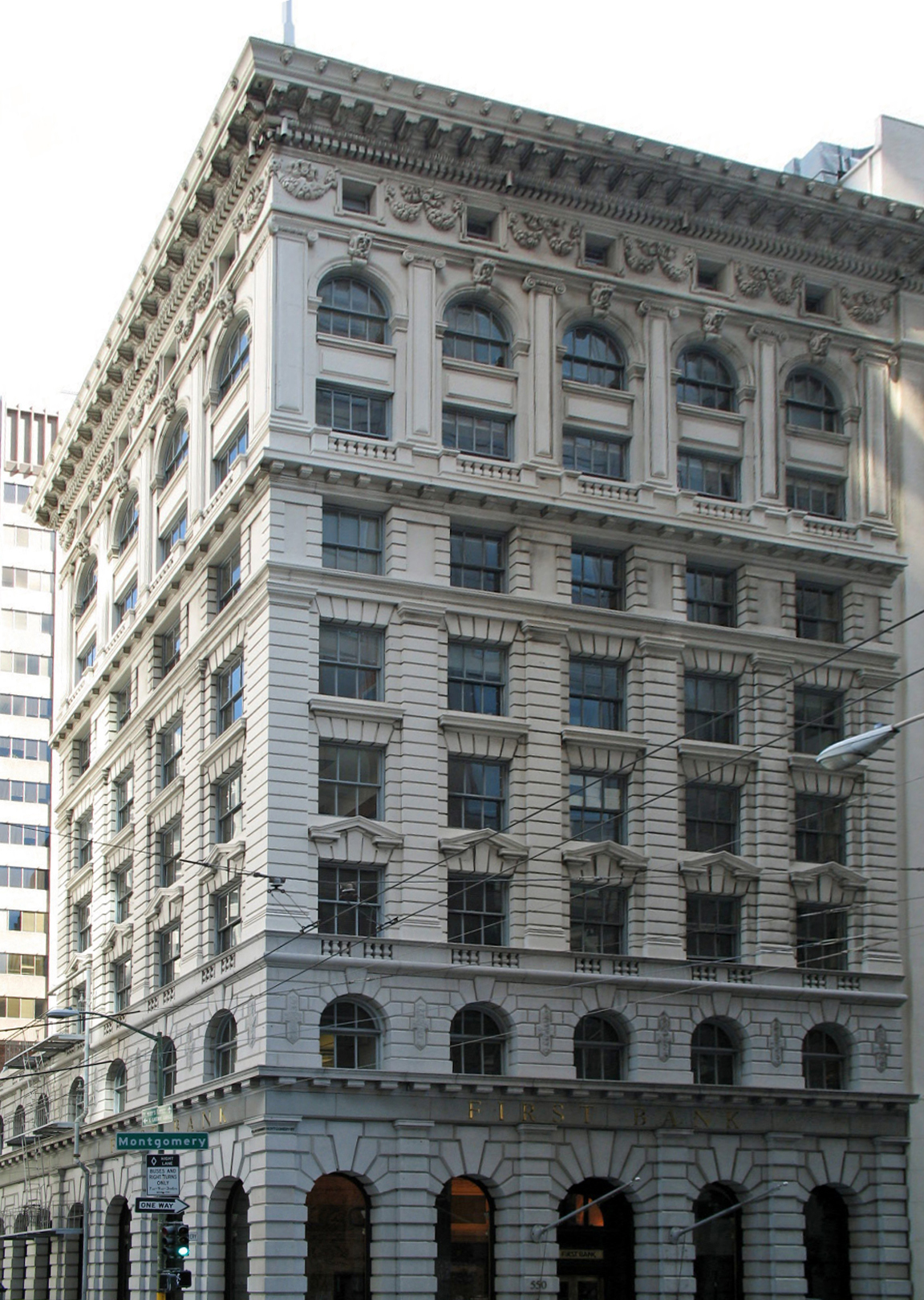
- Bank of Italy Building, 550 Montgomery Street, San Francisco. Also known as the Clay-Montgomery Building.

- Location within San Francisco County Location within California Location within the United States
- Location: 550 Montgomery Street, San Francisco, California
- Coordinates: 37°47′40.26″N 122°24′5.59″W
- Area: less than one acre
- Built: 1908
- Architect: F.T. Shea
- Architectural style: Renaissance
- NRHP reference No.: 78000754

Significant dates
- Added to NRHP: June 2, 1978
- Designated NHL: June 2, 1978

The Bank of Italy Building, also known as the Clay-Montgomery Building, is a building in San Francisco, California. This eight-story building became the headquarters of A. P. Giannini's Bank of Italy (precursor to the Bank of America) in 1908 after the 1906 San Francisco earthquake and fire destroyed the original bank building on Montgomery Avenue (now Columbus Avenue) in the nearby neighborhood of North Beach. The building was designated a National Historic Landmark in 1978 for its association with Giannini, who revolutionized retail banking in the early 20th century.

== History ==
Following the destruction of the original headquarters, the Bank of Italy was briefly run from two locations, one on the Washington Street wharf and the other from the home of Giannini's brother on Van Ness Avenue. Shortly thereafter, more permanent accommodations were found in a building on Montgomery Avenue near the site of the original headquarters.

The building was designed by Frank T. Shea of Shea & Lofquist, architects. The ground floor facade is built from granite cladding while the upper ones, which mimic the design forms, are from less expensive terra-cotta. The interior is a jewel box of white marble and gold leaf detailing with a spectacular coffered ceiling.

During this period, Giannini and the bank directors decided to construct their own bank building. A parcel of land was purchased for $125,000 at the corner of Clay and Montgomery streets. Due to demands on the bank's funds following the fires, construction was not started for nearly a year after the land purchase.

The building opened on August 17, 1908, and served as the headquarters of the Bank of Italy until 1921 when operations were moved to a newer building at 1 Powell Street. Following the headquarters move, the building served as the headquarters for Giannini's Liberty Bank System. In the 1930s, the building became a Bank of America branch.

On September 4, 2012, men's luxury retailer Wingtip (formerly known as On The Fly) opened a retail location on the building's ground floor, with tailoring and barber services in the basement vault.

== Preservation ==
The Bank of Italy Building was declared a National Historic Landmark in 1978, and was added to the National Register of Historic Places on June 2, 1978.

The external structure is predominantly original with the exception of the replacement of the original doors and the addition of another entrance. Additionally, the windows that originally existed on the south side of the building were bricked over when the neighboring Scatena Building was constructed.

The interior of the upper floors (2–8) have seen extensive modification and little remains of the original design. The basement has also been heavily modified with the exception of the original safe containing 5,000 safe deposit boxes. The first floor retains much of the original plaster and marble work. The tables, marble counters, wainscoting, and light fixtures are also originals. The original bronze teller cages have been replaced with newer protective cages that retain the look of the originals.

== See also ==
- Bank of Italy (disambiguation)
- Bank of America History
