= Bank of America NT&SA =

Bank of America, National Trust and Savings Association (NT&SA) was the primary bank subsidiary of BankAmerica Corp. Amadeo Giannini chose this unusual extension for the bank's name in order to highlight its multiple functions when it converted from a state charter to a national one. The bank was founded as Bank of Italy on October 17, 1904.

The bank retained the "NT&SA" designation until being renamed to Bank of America, N.A., as part of BankAmerica Corp.'s merger with NationsBank in 1998.
