= Bank of Italy Building (San Jose, California) =

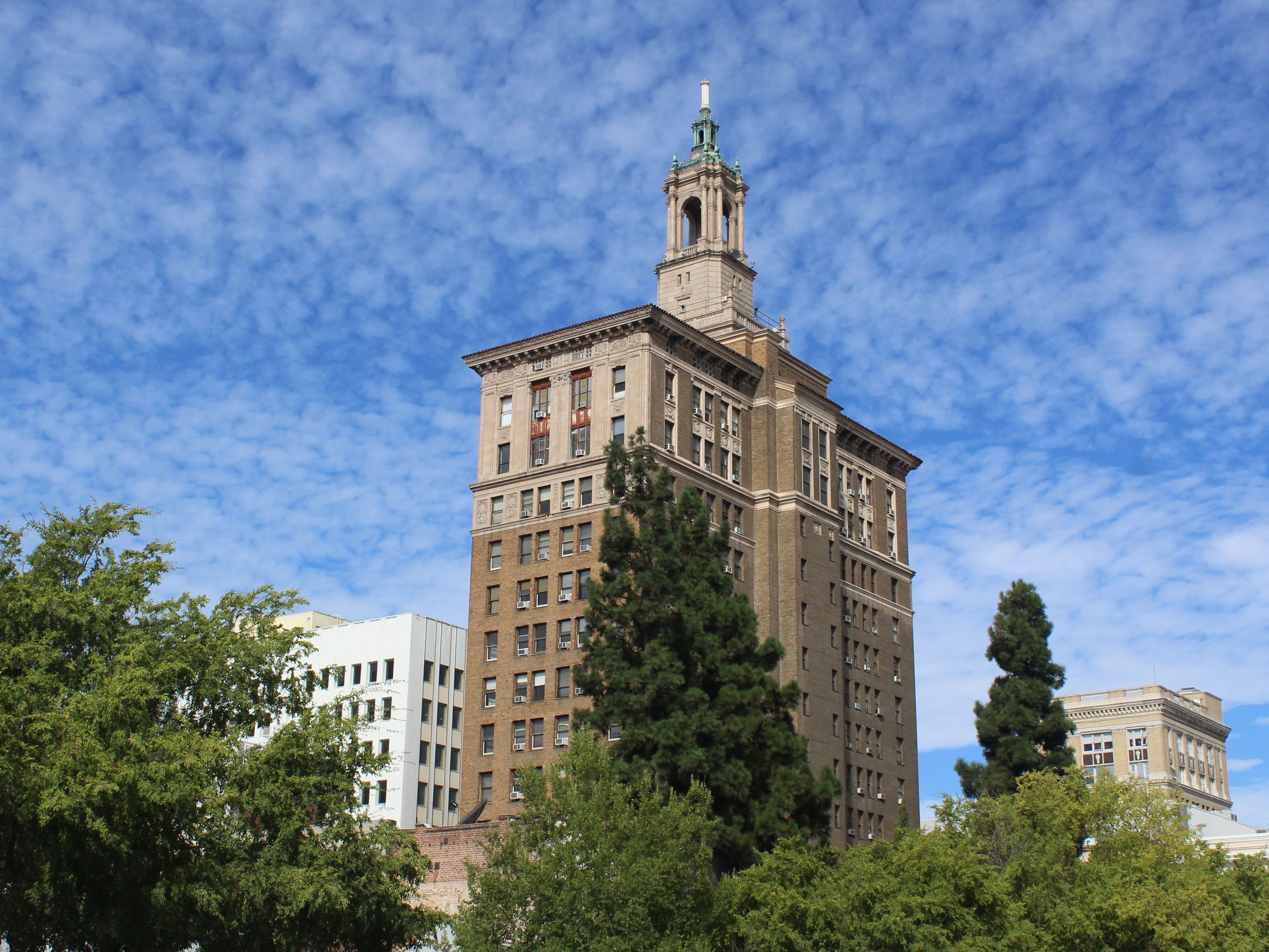
- Former names: Bank of America Building

General information
- Status: Completed
- Type: Commercial offices
- Architectural style: Renaissance Revival
- Location: 30 South First Street; San Jose, California
- Coordinates: 37.3358°N 121.89°W
- Construction started: 1925
- Completed: 1926
- Cost: US$1 million

Height
- Antenna spire: 77.72 m (255.0 ft)
- Roof: 69.2 m (227 ft)
- Top floor: 53.65 m (176.0 ft)

Technical details
- Floor count: 14
- Floor area: almost 100,000 sq ft (9,300 m^{2})
- Lifts/elevators: 3

Design and construction
- Architect: Henry A. Minton

The Bank of Italy Building is a 14-story, 77.72 m (255.0 ft) Renaissance Revival high-rise office building on the corner of South First Street and Santa Clara Street in downtown San Jose, California. Built in 1925–26 as San Jose's first skyscraper, it has a red-tile hip roof and a decorative cupola with a needle-like spire featuring a tall green light. It is a designated San Jose Historical Landmark and part of the Downtown Historic District.

== History ==
Built in 1925–26 to a design by architect Henry A. Minton, the Bank of Italy Building is one of the oldest skyscrapers in Silicon Valley. Until 1970, it was the tallest building between San Francisco and Los Angeles. It was the second home of the first San Jose branch of the Bank of Italy (which later became the Bank of America). That branch, the first Bank of Italy branch outside San Francisco, was opened in 1909 in the Commercial and Savings Bank building further west on Santa Clara St. at the corner of Lightston Alley; a reconstruction is at History Park in San Jose.

== 2010-present ==
The building is a San Jose Historical Landmark, and in a National Register of Historic Places-designated Historic District. In the 21st century, its office space has housed many companies including law firms, tax services, and an AIDS advocacy group. The street-level retail space has housed a pawn shop and a nightclub.

In December 2017, local real estate investors and developers Gary Dillabough and Jeff Arrillaga bought the Bank of Italy Building for $27.04 million; it had previously had several partial owners on a condominium basis. The original plan was a gut rehabilitation to net zero standards to create small office spaces; following the COVID-19-related downturn, a 2021 concept envisaged a mixed-use conversion including retail and food and with the addition of garden terraces; in early 2024, work began on a residential conversion to include at least 100 apartments on the upper floors of the tower. In June 2024, it was announced that the building is to be the location of the Center for AI Excellence, an incubator for AI start-ups managed by Plug and Play Tech Center.

In 2025 the building was purchased by the Canadian company Westbank who announced that the original facade would be restored and the building converted to 110 housing units. Conversion was anticipated to be complete in Spring or Summer 2027.

== See also ==
- Bank of Italy (disambiguation)
- Bank of America History
- National Register of Historic Places listings in Santa Clara County, California
