= Orra E. Monnette =

American banker (1873–1936)

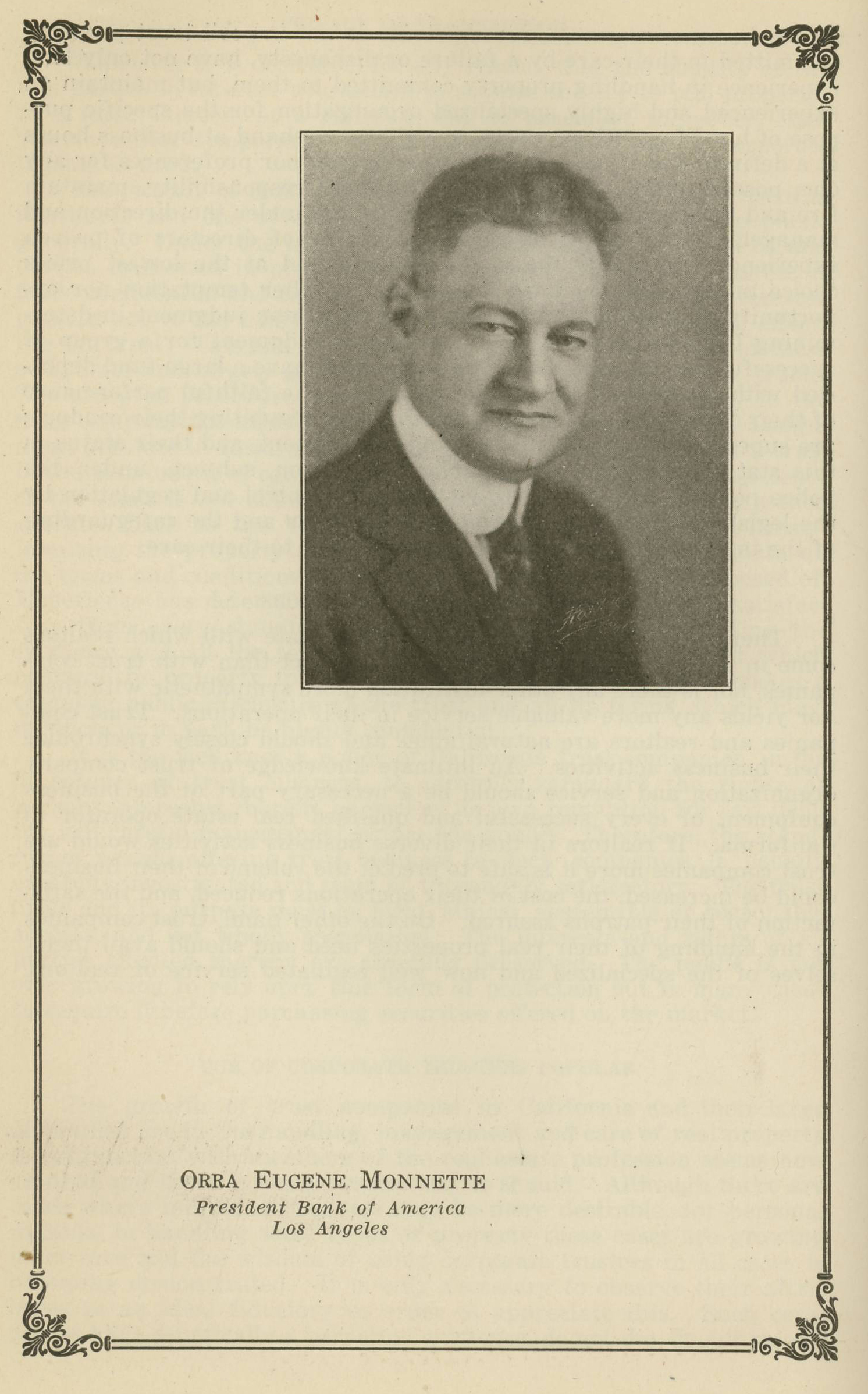
Orra Eugene Monnette Founder Bank of America Los Angeles

Orra Eugene Monnette (1873–1936) was an attorney, author and banker. Monnette was also the founder of the Bank of America, Los Angeles

== Early life ==
Orra E. Monnette was born in southern Crawford County, Ohio to Mervin J. Monnette and Olive Hull Monnette. Monnette's father was involved in farming, raising stock, and banking. Mervin J. Monnette, along with his brothers established the town of Monnett in southern Crawford County, Ohio for the purposes of shipping cattle to the markets north of their farms. His family were staunch members of the Methodist Episcopal Church (aka "M.E. Church") which is now part of the modern United Methodist Church. Monnette's great-grandfather was the Reverend Jeremiah Crabb Monnett, an itinerant Methodist Episcopal preacher who led the settlement of Southern Crawford County by M.E. Church members.

Monnette attended Ohio Wesleyan University in Delaware, Ohio, where he joined the Phi Kappa Psi fraternity. A first cousin of his grandfather – Mary Monnett Bain – had donated a sizable sum to the college in the 1850s which resulted in the building of Monnett Hall. In his youth, Monnette also helped in the organization of subscriptions for the building of Monnett Memorial M. E. Chapel in Crawford County Ohio.

Monnette was admitted to the Ohio bar in 1896, practicing in Bucyrus, Ohio, and later relocating to Toledo, Ohio. He was admitted to the California bar in 1909.

== Banking business ==
While Monnette was trained as an attorney, his father's foray into mining in 1904–1906 changed his career path. In 1906, the elder Monnette struck a significant gold vein in the previously thought tapped out Mohawk Mine, Tonopah, Nevada (near Goldfield, Nevada). The strike, known as the Monnette-Hayes Lease, with mining expert G. H. Hayes, set records for the value of the ore shipped in 1906. Eventually, Mervin Monnette realized a $5,000,000 profit on the Mohawk, which he assigned to his son for investment.

With his father's mining proceeds, Orra Monnette began purchasing stock in Los Angeles area banks. Eventually, this led to a controlling interest in the American National Bank of Los Angeles (ANB). In 1909, ANB was merged into Citizens Trust and Savings Bank of Los Angeles. In 1911, Monnette purchased the Broadway Bank and Trust Company, which when merged with the family's other holdings formed the Citizens Bank and Trust Company, of which Orra E. Monnette was chairman of the board. Monnette left Citizens in 1922.

His next venture, opening at the corner of Wilshire and Western Avenues in Los Angeles in 1923 was christened Bank of America, Los Angeles (BoA). On opening day, the bank posted an operating capital of one million dollars. Monnette's intention was to build capital for national expansion; however, over the course of the 1920s, Bank of Italy's Amadeo Giannini began buying stock in BoA, L.A. In 1928 Monnette and Giannini, agreed that a merger of both entities under the Bank of America name promised the best opportunity for all concerned. As part of the deal, Monnette sold his rights to the "Foundation Story" of the combined entity. Monnette was growing concerned about the stock and financial markets. The formal name change to Bank of America National Trust and Savings Bank. Initially, Monnette was named co-chairman of the new BoA and made a director of the bank. During the early 1930s, with his interests elsewhere, Monnette was made a vice president in the bank and retained his board seat.

Monnette also founded the Lincoln Mortgage Company of California, which was not included in the BoA merger. Monnette retained control of the company and continued to serve as its president until his death.

== Civic life ==
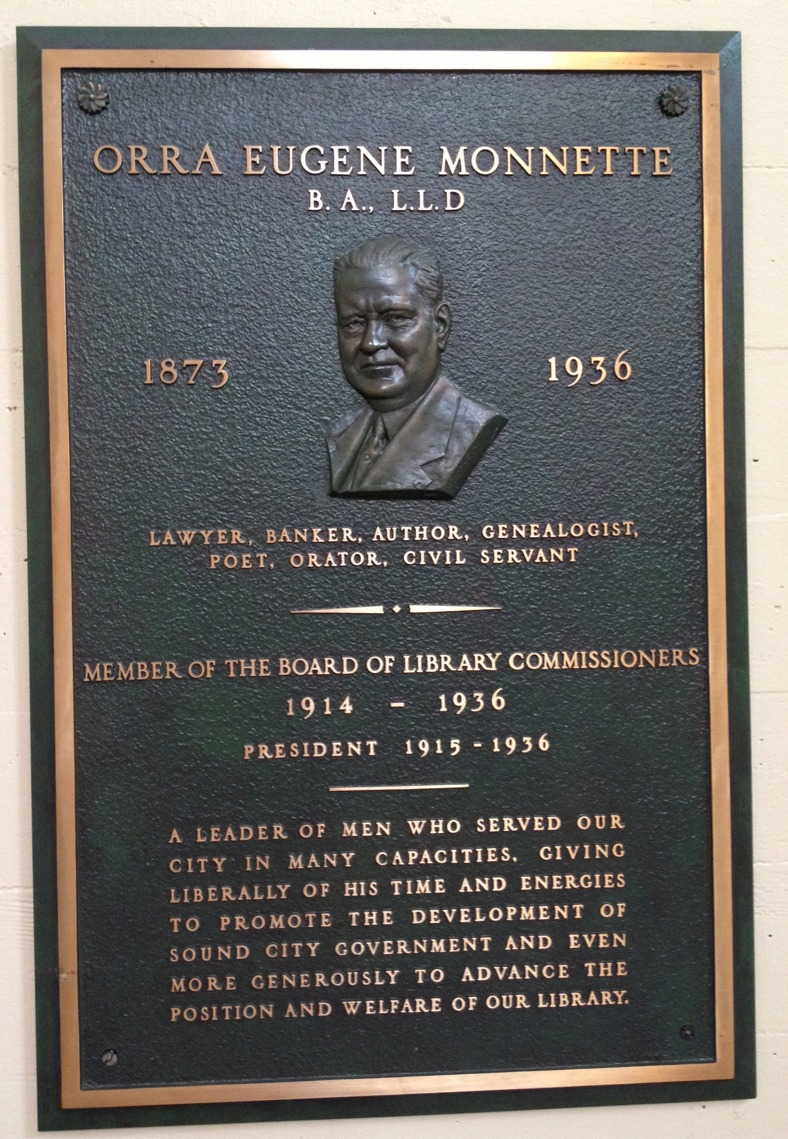
Bronze plaque, dedicated to Orra E. Monnette, President of the Los Angeles Public Library system from 1915 to 1936. The plaque is on display in the Los Angeles Central Library rotunda and replaces an earlier bronze bust of Monnette lost in the Central Library fire.

Throughout his life in Los Angeles, California, Orra Monnette served on numerous commissions and boards charged with public projects and the operation of various public organizations. Monnette was appointed to the Los Angeles Municipal Annexation Commission in 1913, to the Los Angeles City Planning Commission in 1920 and was made a member of the board of freeholders which framed Los Angeles’ city charter between 1923 and 1924.

In 1914, Monnette was appointed to the Los Angeles Public Library Board, and reappointed every five years until his death in 1936. Monnette was elected president of the library board in 1916, and retained that office until his death as well. During the 23 years of his tenure, Monnette championed three major library bond packages which were supported by the citizens of Los Angeles. The bond packages allowed the city to build 48 branches throughout the Los Angeles area as well as the landmark art deco Central Library in Downtown Los Angeles.

In 1907, Monnette became a Life Member of the Sons of the Revolution in the State of California. An avid genealogist, he brought experience and leadership to the evolution of the society's library, founded in 1893, which remains open free to the public as a public service of that organization. Mervin Jeremiah Monnette, Orra's father, joined him as a Life Member in 1908.

On April 17, 1908, Monnette was admitted to life membership in the Society of Colonial Wars, General Society membership number 4176, California Society membership number 72. He was very active with the group and served as its "Governor" (president) of the California Society from 1915 to 1916. He held office in the General Society from 1916 to 1920.

Monnette served as the National President of the Phi Kappa Psi fraternity from 1912-1914.

Orra E. Monnette died in Los Angeles California on February 24th, 1936; his death was noted in the Los Angeles City Council minutes following the passage of a resolution in his honor. In addition to the placement of a memorial bronze bust of Monnette honoring him in the lobby of the Main Library, in 1961 his complete genealogical library of over 1,700 books on the subject and history, along with genealogical notes were given to the Los Angeles Public Library System. The book collection remains an important part of genealogy section for the Central Library, and the private papers and genealogical notes are held by accessible in the manuscript division. In 2006, the remainder of Monnette's personal papers were given to the Huntington Library in San Marino, California.

Despite the misspelling, Monette Place, a small street in what is now L.A.'s Koreatown, was named in 1912 to honor Monnette – or rather his father Mervin, whose house was located right around the corner on Western Avenue.

== Bibliography ==
- Breithaupt, Jr., Richard Hoag, 1994, Sons of the Revolution in the State of California. Centennial Register 1893-1993, Walika Publishing Company, ISBN 1-886085-00-5
