= Bank of America, Los Angeles =

Bank business

The Bank of America, Los Angeles, was established in 1923 by Orra E. Monnette, emerging from a series of mergers between Los Angeles–based banks between 1909 and 1923. The formation of BoA L.A. predates the creation of the Bank of America, merging with the Bank of Italy in 1928-29, which formed Bank of America.

== History ==
Bank of America, Los Angeles was formed when Monnette purchased controlling interest of the Los Angeles based American National Bank of Los Angeles (ANB) using profits from his father's silver mine in Tonopah, Nevada.

In 1909, ANB was merged into Citizens Trust and Savings Bank; in 1911, Monnette purchased the Broadway Bank and Trust Company, which when merged with the family’s other holdings formed the Citizens Bank and Trust Company.

In 1923, Citizens Bank and Trust Company was renamed Bank of America, Los Angeles. Monnette's intention was to build capital for national expansion with Amadeo Giannini, founder of San Francisco-based Bank of Italy, as a minority investor. Giannini had founded the Bank of Italy on October 17, 1904. In 1928, Giannini approached Monnette about pursuing a merger with BoA; both were concerned about the state of the American economy.

One thing that the Bank of America, Los Angeles had that made it an attractive merge partner was its advanced bank branch system that employed centralized accounting and cash distribution system. BoA LA had its own secure fleet of armoured cars to transport branch cash supplies, keeping its branches stocked with controlled amounts while other banks kept larger amounts on site, and thus away from investment purposes. With Monnette wishing to ease into retirement, and with no real heir apparent, BoA LA welcomed the combination of the two concerns under the name Bank of America. They created what would become the largest banking institution in the country.

The resulting bank, known as Bank of Italy, emerged prior to the stock market crash of 1929. It was renamed on November 3, 1930, to Bank of America National Trust and Savings Association, which was the only such designated bank in the United States at that time. Giannini and Monnette headed the resulting company, serving as co-chairs.

== See also ==
- Bank of Italy (USA)
