= Bank of Italy (Tracy, California) =

Historic building in Tracy, California, USA

- Bank of Italy (American Bank of Tracy)
- U.S. National Register of Historic Places
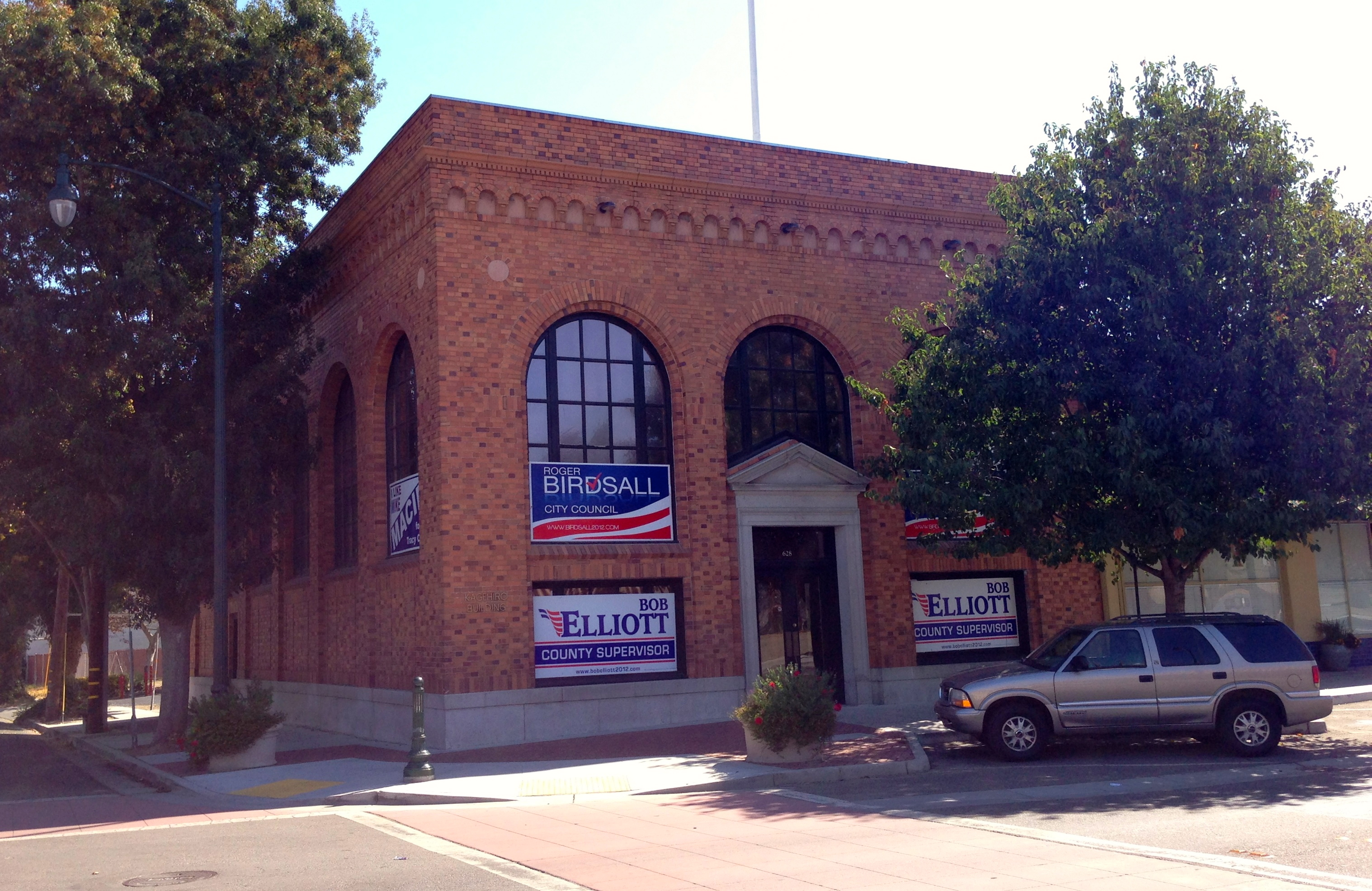
- Bank of Italy, Tracy, California

- Location within Northern California
- Location: 628 Central Ave., Tracy, California
- Coordinates: 37°44′08″N 121°25′28″W
- Area: 0.8 acres (0.32 ha)
- Built: 1919
- Architectural style: Renaissance Revival
- NRHP reference No.: 85001591
- Added to NRHP: July 18, 1985

The Bank of Italy in Tracy, California, also known as the Old Bank of America Building, the American Bank of Tracy, and the Kagehiro Building, is a historic bank building completed in 1919. It was added to the National Register of Historic Places in 1985.

== History ==
The Bank of Italy building is a two-story brick commercial structure with a second-story window arcade. It was completed in 1919. It cost $35,000 to build at the time and is still intact.

Originally, the building was the American Bank of Tracy, founded by Philip Fabian and Abe Grunauer. In 1921, the building was purchased and became a branch of A. P. Giannini's Bank of Italy, and subsequently Bank of America.

== See also ==
- Bank of Italy (disambiguation)
- Bank of America History
- Bank of Italy (United States)
