= Bank of Italy (Visalia, California) =

- Bank of Italy Building
- U.S. National Register of Historic Places
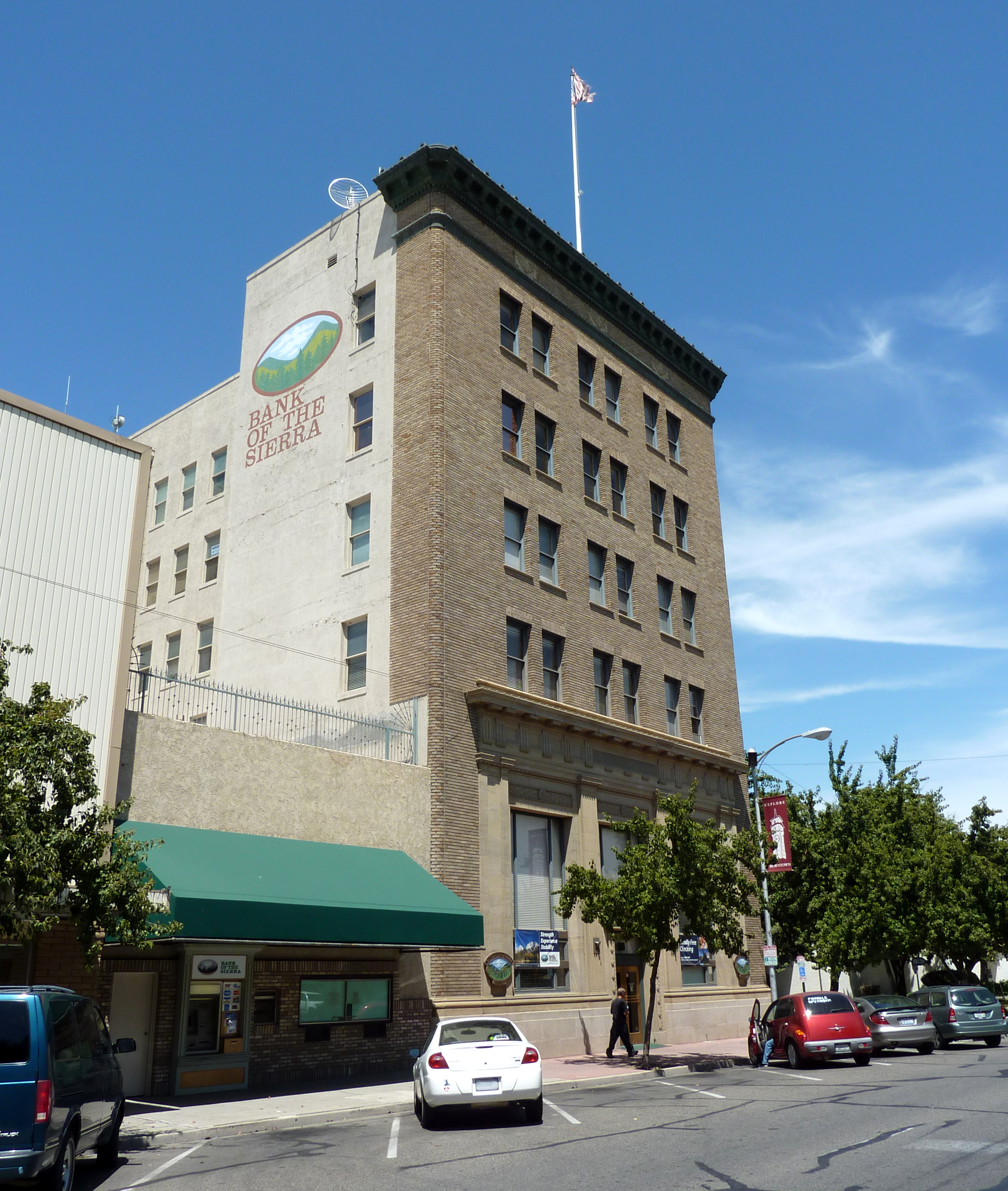
- Bank of Italy building

- Location within California Location within the United States
- Location: 128 E. Main St., Visalia, California
- Coordinates: 36°19′49″N 119°17′16″W
- Area: 0.2 acres (0.081 ha)
- Built: 1923
- Architect/builder: R.F. Felchlin Co.
- Architectural style: Classical Revival
- NRHP reference No.: 82002280
- Added to NRHP: April 1, 1982

Bank of Italy building in Downtown Visalia was constructed in 1923 at 128 East Main Street. The building has five stories plus a basement. R. F. Felchin, a Fresno-based construction company, provided architectural, engineering, and contracting services. The ground level was designed as a bank, with the remaining space reserved for offices. Later, it became the Bank of America. Today, the ground floor remains a bank, while the upper floors continue to provide office space.

The building was listed on the National Register of Historic Places in Tulare County, California, on April 1, 1982.

== See also ==
- Bank of Italy (disambiguation)
- Bank of America History
