= Three Notch Road =

Historic military road in Alabama and Florida, U.S.

Three Notch Road was a 233-mile-long (375 km) historic road mostly in the US state of Alabama that ran from Pensacola, Florida, to Fort Mitchell in Russell County, Alabama. U.S. Route 29 in Alabama generally follows the route of the original road.

== History ==
The road was built by the US military in 1824. It started at Fort Barrancas in Pensacola, Florida, and ended at Fort Mitchell, Alabama, near present-day Columbus, Georgia. Letters exchanged between Quartermaster General Thomas Jesup and the Assistant Quartermaster General in Pensacola, Captain Daniel E. Burch, indicate its origin: in June, Burch recommended the construction of a wagon trail, and in September Jesup gave him the authority to start surveying after he finished the survey for the Federal Road that opened up the lands of the Creek people.

The military road was called Road No. 6 in official reports, but locally was called "Three Notch Road" because the route was marked by three notches cut in trees along the way. The route was finished in 1824, and cost $1,130 to build (over $31,000 as of 2021); it generally follows the sandy ridge that divides the watershed of the Conecuh River (to the northwest) from that of the Yellow River and the Pea River to the southeast.

The road was built for a military purpose. The United States Department of War, led by John C. Calhoun, funded it as a "military emergency measure": U.S. Army troops had to supply Fort Mitchell (which protected settlers) overland, through the homeland of the Creek Indians, since the Chattahoochee River was not yet navigable for steamboats. It soon became the way for many settlers to reach that part of Alabama.

== Route and namesakes ==
The exact route is not known; for instance, whether it ran through Andalusia, Alabama, is not clear. Still, streets and buildings (including a school) in Andalusia bore names that included "Three Notch" ("East Three Notch Street" and "South Three Notch Street" (for over a century, as of 2010), as does the Three Notch Museum (housed in a depot from the Central of Georgia Railway.) Troy, Alabama, also has an East Three Notch and South Three Notch Street. Bullock County, Alabama, has a small community (and a railway station, on the Central of Georgia Railway) named "Three Notch". The Three Notch Railroad, a short line railroad, operates between Georgiana and Andalusia. Peter A. Brannon, of the Alabama Department of Archives and History, reported that locals remembered seeing the three notches on various old trees along the road, south of Troy.

There is a historical marker for the road in Blues Old Stand, Alabama.
