= South Alabama Regional Airport =

South Alabama Regional Airport Bill Benton Field
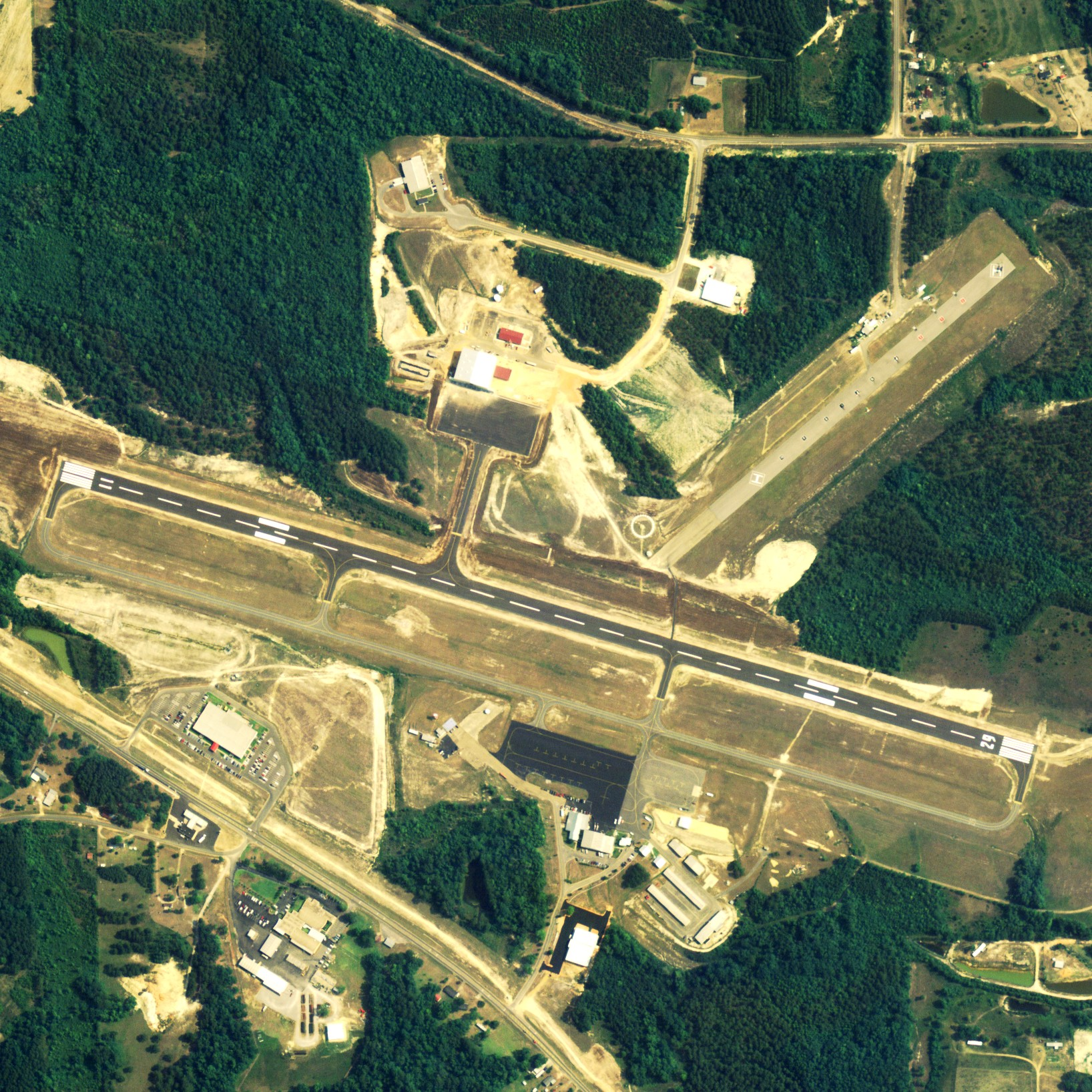
- NAIP aerial image, 2006
- IATA: none; ICAO: none; FAA LID: 79J

Summary
- Airport type: Public
- Owner: South Alabama Regional Airport Authority
- Serves: Andalusia & Opp, Alabama
- Location: Covington County, Alabama
- Elevation AMSL: 310 ft (94 m)
- Coordinates: 31°18′30″N 086°23′32″W

Map
- Location of airport in Alabama 79J (the United States)

Runways
Direction	Length		Surface
Direction	ft	m	Surface
11/29	6,000	1,829	Asphalt

Statistics (2017)
- Aircraft operations (2016): 62,750
- Based aircraft: 30
- Source: FAA and City of Andalusia

South Alabama Regional Airport at Bill Benton Field (FAA LID: 79J), formerly known as Andalusia-Opp Airport, is a public use airport in Covington County, Alabama, United States. It is located four nautical miles (5 mi, 7 km) east of the central business district of Andalusia and about 9 miles (14 km) west of Opp. The airport is governed by the South Alabama Regional Airport Authority, with members appointed by the Andalusia City Council, the Opp Council, and the Covington County Commission.

This airport is included in the FAA's National Plan of Integrated Airport Systems for 2011–2015 and 2009–2013, both of which categorized it as a general aviation facility.

The Andalusia-Opp Airport Authority voted in May 2007 to change the name of the airport to South Alabama Regional Airport. It was also announced the same month that the airport had received a grant from the U.S. Department of Transportation to extend the runway from 5,000 to 6,000 feet (1,800 m).

== Facilities and aircraft ==
South Alabama Regional Airport covers an area of 615 acres (249 ha) at an elevation of 310 feet (94 m) above mean sea level. It has one runway designated 11/29 with an asphalt surface measuring 6,000 by 100 feet (1,829 x 30 m).

For the 12-month period ending June 16, 2009, the airport had 62,750 aircraft operations, an average of 171 per day: 81% military and 19% general aviation. At that time there were 18 aircraft based at this airport: 89% single-engine and 11% multi-engine.

== See also ==
- List of airports in Alabama
