= Bank of Andalusia =

- U.S. National Register of Historic Places
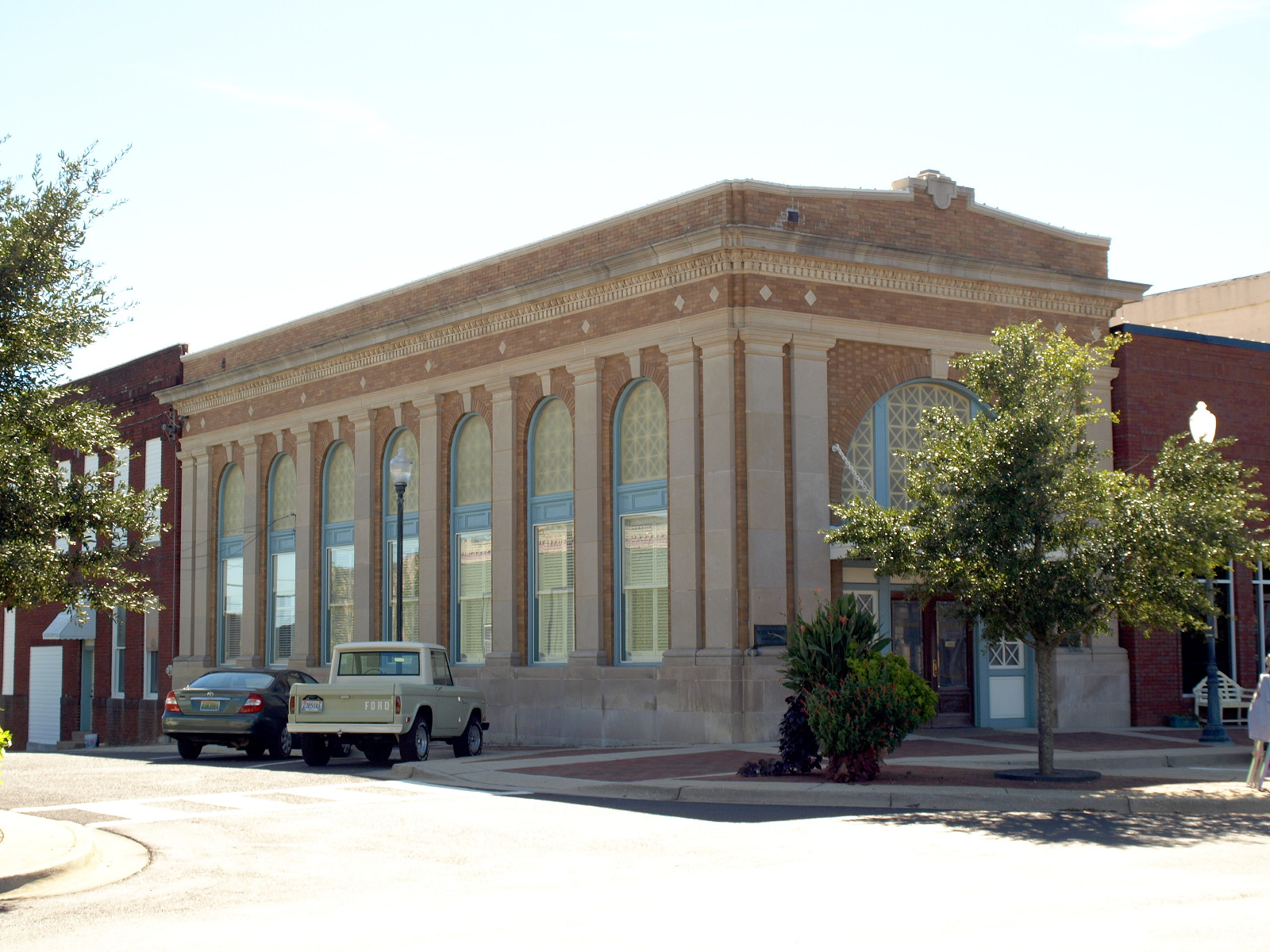

- Location within Alabama
- Location: 28 S. Court Sq., Andalusia, Alabama
- Coordinates: 31°18′27″N 86°28′56″W
- Area: 0.2 acres (0.081 ha)
- Built: 1914
- Architectural style: Classical Revival
- NRHP reference No.: 88003239
- Added to NRHP: January 28, 1989

The Bank of Andalusia, at 28 South Court Square in Andalusia, Alabama, United States, was built in 1914. It was listed on the National Register of Historic Places in 1989.

It is one-story brick building with a parapeted roof with a "pseudo-pediment", and is in an Early Classical Revival style. It has a cut stone cornice with a frieze and dentils created by J. Thurron & Co. of New York City. Its entryway has pairs of stone Tuscan pilasters supporting a carved stone molding.

It was expanded to the rear in 1924 by local craftsman, in more utilitarian style, but still with a parapeted roof and a cornice. On the inside, the appearance is of just one building.
