= WAAO-FM =

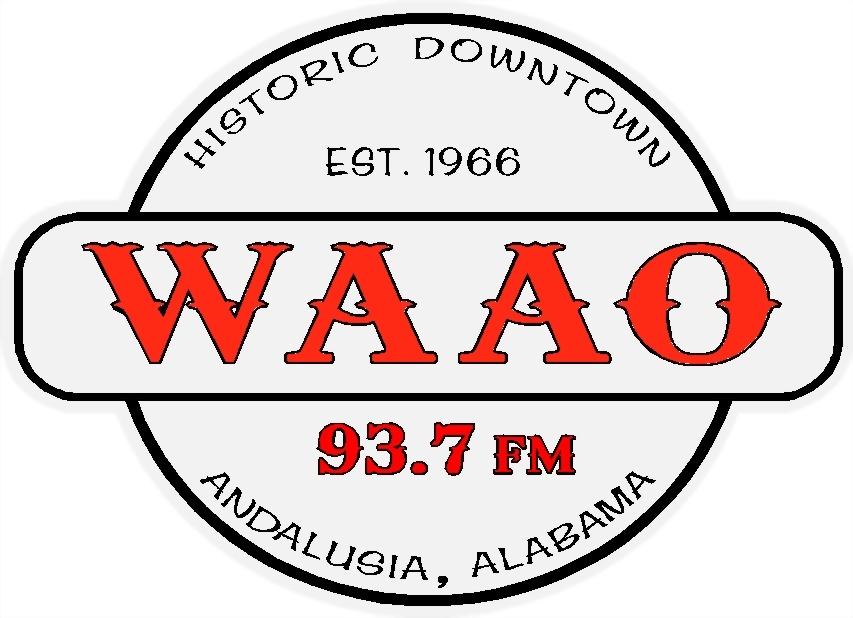
- Andalusia, Alabama; United States
- Broadcast area: Covington County, Alabama
- Frequency: 93.7 MHz
- Branding: New Hit Country 93.7!

Programming
- Format: Country
- Affiliations: Auburn Network; Premiere Networks; Performance Racing Network; Motor Racing Network; Fox News Radio

Ownership
- Owner: Three Notch Communications, LLC
- Sister stations: WAAO LDTV 40

History
- First air date: August 24, 1987 (at 104.7)
- Former frequencies: 104.7 MHz (1987–1990); 103.7 MHz (1990–2015)

Technical information
- Licensing authority: FCC
- Facility ID: 13502
- Class: C3
- ERP: 23,000 watts
- HAAT: 100 meters (328 feet)
- Transmitter coordinates: 31°20′27″N 86°28′02″W

Links
- Public license information: Public file; LMS
- Webcast: Listen Live
- Website: waao.com

WAAO-FM (93.7 MHz, "New Hit Country 93.7") is an American radio station licensed to serve the community of Andalusia, the county seat of Covington County, Alabama. The station, established in 1987, is owned by Three Notch Communications, LLC.

== Programming ==
WAAO-FM broadcasts a country music format to south Alabama and parts of the panhandle of Florida out of Covington County, Alabama. Some of this programming comes from Dial Global's Mainstream Country radio network.

Local weekday programming includes The WAY-YO Wake-Up Crew with Blaine Wilson, Wynne Glenn, and Jim Wilson; a weekday tradio program known as "The Party Line" with Andrea Wilson; and The Afternoon Drive with Kim Brewer.

Syndicated programming includes Fox News Radio, the Motor Racing Network, the Performance Racing Network, Nash Nights Live with Shawn Parr, and The Original Country Gold with Rowdy Yates, plus Auburn Tigers football and men's basketball.

== History ==
WAAO-FM was preceded by AM station WAAO, a 1-kilowatt daytimer on 1530 kHz. It signed on in 1966, and its license was surrendered effective July 5, 1989 as WAAO-FM prepared to sign on.

Companion Broadcasting Service, Inc., received the original construction permit from the Federal Communications Commission on April 2, 1987, for a new FM station broadcasting with 3,000 watts of effective radiated power at 104.7 MHz. The new station was assigned the call letters WAAO-FM by the FCC on April 9, 1987. WAAO-FM received its license to cover from the FCC on December 29, 1989.

On December 28, 1990, the station was granted a modification of its broadcast license to move from 104.7 MHz to the current 103.7 MHz, per docket #86-455.

Station owner Lee Williams made an organizational shuffle in June 2002 with Companion Broadcasting Service, Inc. transferring the license for this station to Companion Broadcasting Service, LLC. At the time of the deal, he was 100% owner of both entities. The move was approved by the FCC on July 12, 2002, and the transaction was consummated on September 2, 2002.

In May 2008, Companion Broadcasting Service, LLC, reached an agreement to sell this station to Three Notch Communications, LLC, for a reported sale price of $1.25 million. This new licensee is owned by Blaine L. Wilson and this sale marks the first time since WAAO-FM went on the air that control of its license passed outside the Williams family. The deal was approved by the FCC on July 7, 2008, and the transaction was consummated on August 5, 2008.

On October 17, 2015, WAAO-FM 93.7 received approval to begin transmitting at 23 kW, and on October 21, 2015, it was licensed to broadcast on 93.7 MHz.

== Station administration ==
- Blaine Wilson - General Manager/Owner
- Andrea Wilson - billing & account receivables

== Previous logo ==
(WAAO's logo under previous 103.7 frequency)
