= Avant House (Andalusia, Alabama) =

Historic house in Alabama, United States

- U.S. National Register of Historic Places
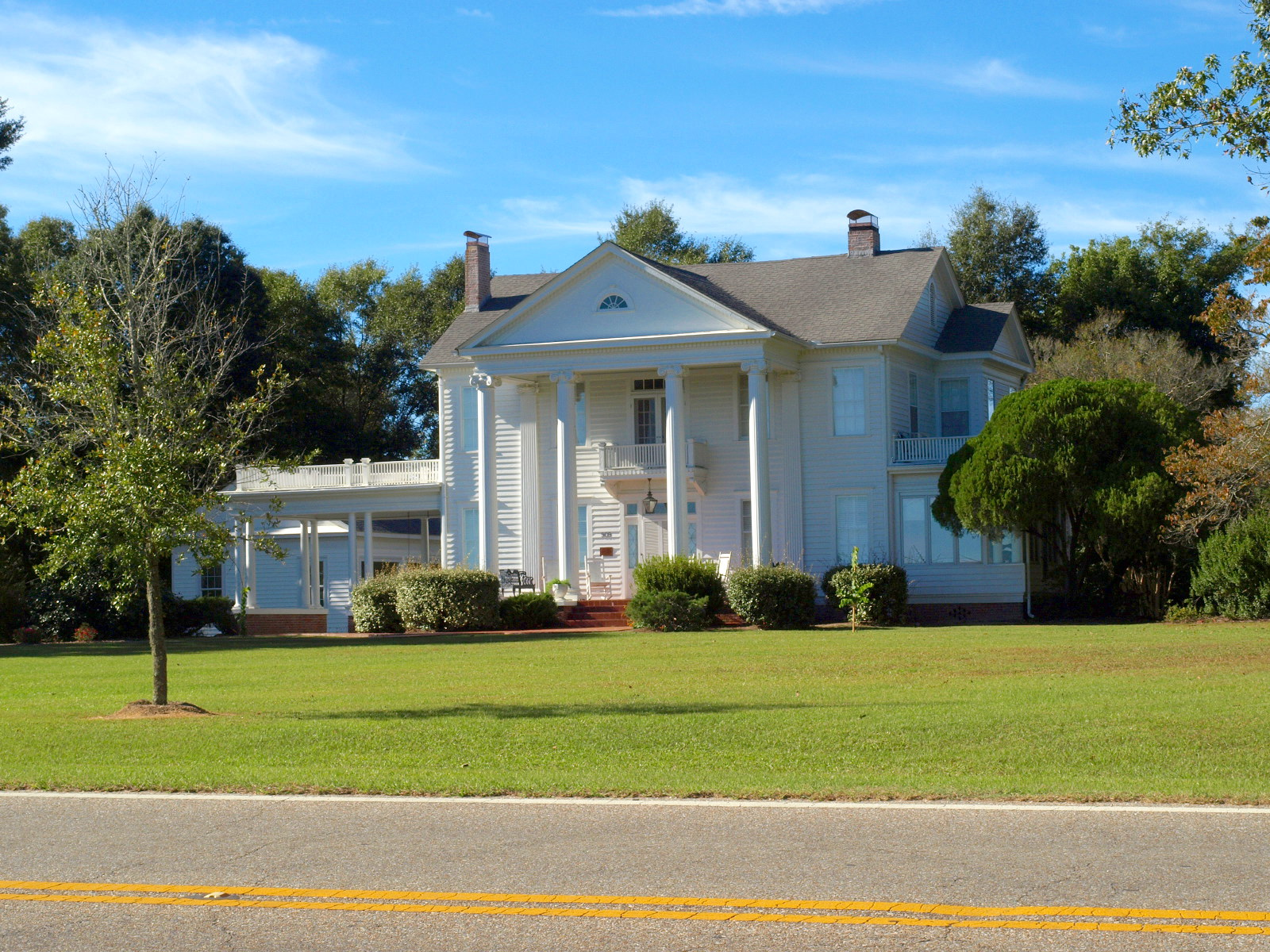
- Avant House in 2014

- Location within Alabama Location within the United States
- Location: 909 Sanford Rd., Andalusia, Alabama
- Coordinates: 31°19′5″N 86°26′45″W
- Area: 3.5 acres (1.4 ha)
- Built: 1914
- Architect: Lockwood, Frank; Merrill, E.R.
- Architectural style: Classical Revival
- NRHP reference No.: 96000046
- Added to NRHP: February 16, 1996

Avant House is a historic house at 909 Sanford Road in Andalusia, Alabama, United States. It was built by Frank Lockwood. It is listed on the National Register of Historic Places. It was refurbished by William W. Avant (1922–2011) in his retirement.
