= WLBF =

Montgomery, Alabama; United States
- Frequency: 89.1 MHz
- Branding: Faith Radio

Programming
- Format: Religious

Ownership
- Owner: Faith Broadcasting, Inc
- Sister stations: WDYF, WSTF

History
- First air date: April 4, 1984
- Call sign meaning: We Live By Faith

Technical information
- Licensing authority: FCC
- Facility ID: 43643
- Class: C1
- ERP: 100,000 watts
- HAAT: 164.0 meters
- Transmitter coordinates: 32°24′13″N 86°11′50″W

Links
- Public license information: Public file; LMS
- Webcast: Listen live
- Website: www.faithradio.org

WLBF (89.1 FM, "Faith Radio") is a non-commercial radio station licensed to serve Montgomery, Alabama, United States. The station is owned by Faith Broadcasting, Inc. It airs a religious radio format.

== History ==
This station received its original construction permit from the Federal Communications Commission on October 18, 1983. The new station was assigned the call letters WLBF by the FCC on December 17, 1983. The station signed on the air on April 4, 1984. WLBF received its license to cover from the FCC on April 28, 1986.

== Translators ==
Call sign	Frequency	City of license	FID	ERP (W)	HAAT	Class	FCC info	Notes
W220BI	91.9 FM FM	Eufaula, Alabama	76475	27	94 m (308 ft)	D	LMS	Signed On In 1996
W231AP	94.1 FM FM	Alexander City, Alabama	143073	80	30.8 m (101 ft)	D	LMS	Signed On In 2007
W231BN	94.1 FM FM	Sylacauga, Alabama	143078	13	92 m (302 ft)	D	LMS	Signed On In 2007
W245AU	96.9 FM FM	Thorsby, Alabama	150897	19	87.3 m (286 ft)	D	LMS	Signed On In 2007
