= Three Notch Museum =

- Central of Georgia Depot
- U.S. National Register of Historic Places
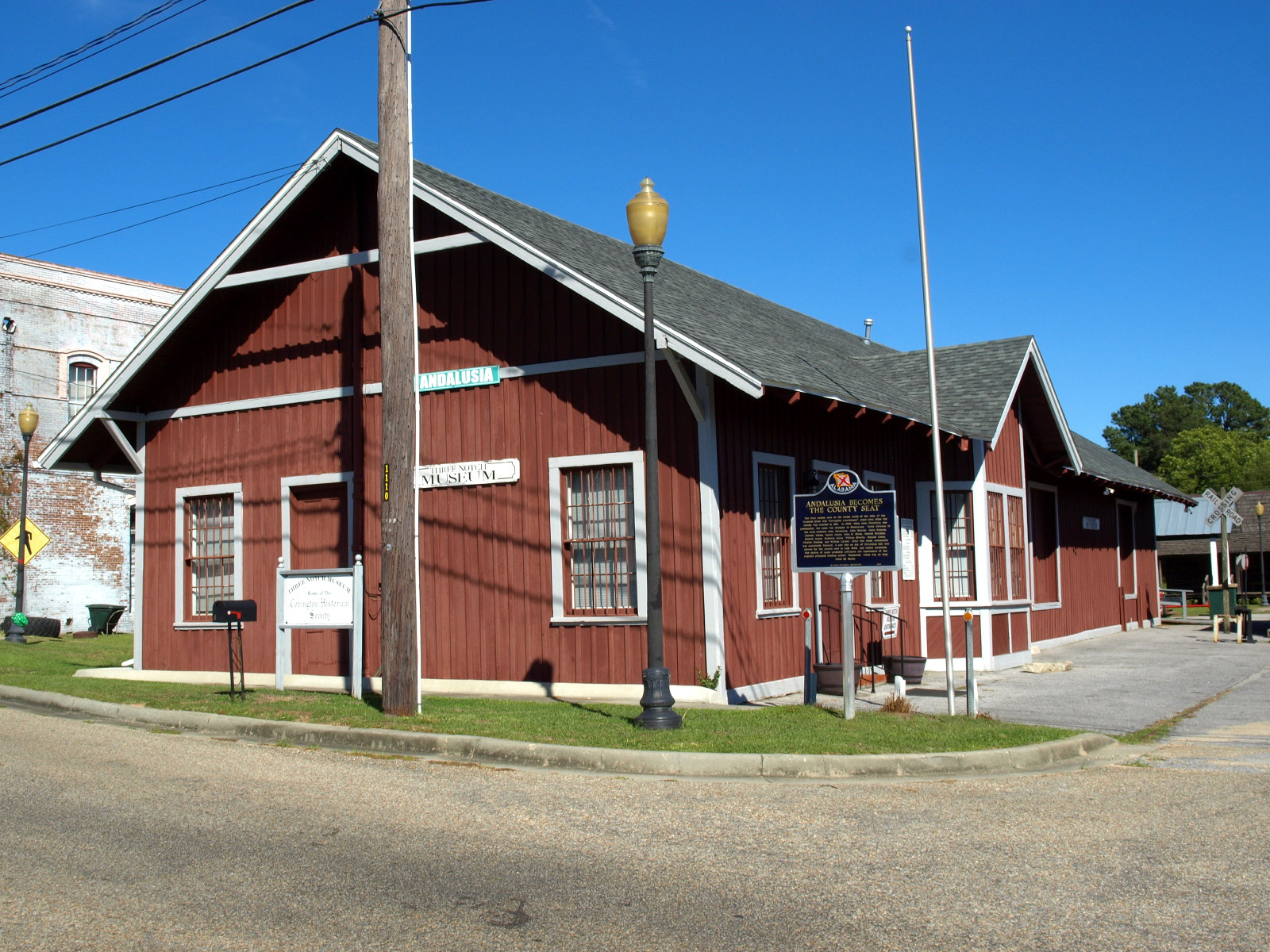
- The former Central of Georgia Depot from Historical Central Street.

- Location within Alabama Location within the United States
- Location: 125 Historical Central St., Andalusia, Alabama
- Coordinates: 31°18′25″N 86°28′51″W
- Area: 0.8 acres (0.32 ha)
- Built: 1899
- NRHP reference No.: 84000606
- Added to NRHP: August 30, 1984

The Central of Georgia Depot in Andalusia, Alabama, United States, is a historic train station that has been converted into the Three Notch Museum.

== Depot history ==
In the late 1890s, business leaders in Andalusia posted a $5000 prize for the first rail line to pass through the town. The Central of Georgia Railway claimed the prize, completing the track in September 1899, and built a depot on land donated by residents. The town flourished with the new rail connection; population rose from 551 in 1900 to 2,480 in 1910. The last Norfolk Southern train, successor to the Central of Georgia, departed Andalusia on March 31, 1983.

The wooden depot is similar in design to other small-town stations along the Central of Georgia line. The one-story, gable-roofed structure is clad with board and batten siding. Two front rooms with separate entrances were used as passenger waiting rooms. At the opposite end of the station is a large freight room. The agent's office spans the width of the building between the two, and features a gabled bay window. The building was listed on the National Register of Historic Places in 1984.

== Museum ==
The building was re-opened as a history museum in 1987; named after the Three Notch Road of which two streets (East Three Notch Street and South Three Notch Street) in Andalusia are also named.

Operated by the Covington Historical Society, the museum focuses on County history and area railroad history. Displays include many photographs, a bottle collection, historic cameras and accessories, tools and military artifacts. Other buildings in the museum include a restored post office with a period schoolroom in back, a pioneer log cabin and a country store. There are also two cabooses and a CSX motor car with a model railway layout outside the depot building.

Preceding station	Central of Georgia Railway	Following station
Terminus	Andalusia – Newnan	Gantt toward Newnan
