= WFXX =

- Georgiana, Alabama; United States
- Broadcast area: Andalusia, Alabama
- Frequency: 107.7 MHz
- Branding: Fox 107.7

Programming
- Format: Adult contemporary
- Affiliations: ABC Radio

Ownership
- Owner: Fox Broadcasting Corp., LLC; (Fox Broadcasting Corporation, LLC)

History
- First air date: 1999
- Former call signs: WZQD (3/1991-9/1991); WWGZ (9/1991-3/1999)
- Call sign meaning: W FoX X

Technical information
- Licensing authority: FCC
- Facility ID: 30886
- Class: C2
- ERP: 42,000 watts
- HAAT: 163 meters (535 feet)
- Transmitter coordinates: 31°27′08″N 86°37′07″W
- Translator: (107.7 MHz) W299BX (Dothan)

Links
- Public license information: Public file; LMS
- Webcast: Listen Live
- Website: fox107.com

WFXX (107.7 FM, "Fox 107.7") is a radio station licensed to serve Georgiana, Alabama, United States. The station is owned by Fox Broadcasting Corp., LLC, through licensee Fox Broadcasting Corporation, LLC. It airs an adult contemporary music format and features programming from ABC Radio., via the satellite service Hits & Favorites. The station is located at 1406 River Falls St., Andalusia, AL 36420

== History ==
The station was granted its original construction permit by the Federal Communications Commission on January 9, 1991. The new station was assigned call letters WZQD on March 8, 1991. On September 20, 1991, the station was assigned new call letters WWGZ.

In June 1994, permit holder Sharon A. Seifert reached an agreement to transfer the permit to Jeffrey K. Haynes. The FCC approved the deal on January 18, 1995, and the transaction was consummated on February 22, 1995.

The station changed call letters to the current WFXX on March 15, 1999. After a series of delays, extensions, and permit renewals, WFXX finally received its license to cover on December 14, 1999.

Jeffrey Haynes sold WFXX to Fox Broadcasting Corporation, LLC; the transaction was consummated on April 28, 2015.
