= Charles Brooks (cartoonist) =

American cartoonist (1920–2011)

Charles G. Brooks (November 22, 1920 – September 29, 2011) was an editorial cartoonist for The Birmingham News in Birmingham, Alabama, United States. He used his platform at The Birmingham News to criticize the Ku Klux Klan, despite the number of powerful supporters in the region at that time.

He won the Sigma Delta Chi Award for the most outstanding editorial cartoon of 1959 and served as president of the Association of American Editorial Cartoonists in 1969.

== Early life ==
Brooks was born in Hopewell, near Andalusia in Covington County, Alabama. After high school he moved to Birmingham and studied at Birmingham–Southern College for two years, and then transferred to the Chicago Academy of Fine Arts where he was instructed by Vaughn Shoemaker (Chicago Daily News) and Don Ulsh. While in Chicago, Brooks met his future wife, Virginia. They had a daughter, Barbara, and son, Charles G. Brooks, Jr.

In 1942 Brooks enlisted in the United States Army. After training he was enrolled in Officers Candidate School and was commissioned a second lieutenant and assigned to the 531st Engineer Shore Regiment. His unit participated in the D-Day landing at Utah Beach on June 6, 1944, mainly helping to establish a supply port at the beachhead. Later that winter the unit, recommissioned as the 3053rd Engineer Combat Battalion, which deployed from Liège deep into Germany with the 9th Army and saw action in the Battle of the Bulge. During his army service Brooks drew several cartoons which appeared in Stars and Stripes.

== Professional life ==
After his discharge in 1945 Brooks returned to his wife and new daughter in Chicago. He worked for Brach's Candy Company and as a bank guard before he found representation at the Fred Zaner Advertising Cartoon Syndicate. Hopeful that he could become an editorial cartoonist he wrote to friends in Birmingham and received mild interest from the Birmingham News. He took a gamble and made the trip to meet with News officials and was offered the position beginning in 1948.

Brooks' cartoons were immediately popular in Birmingham. He used the platform to express great faith in the character of the American people and harsh criticism of anyone or anything that attacked or insulted that character. He did not withhold criticism of the Ku Klux Klan, a group which is believed to have counted many of the city's powerful men among its members. In addition to cartooning, the News lent Brooks out to work with police and the Federal Bureau of Investigation to create sketches of suspects from eyewitness descriptions.

== Honors ==
Brooks won the Sigma Delta Chi Award for the most outstanding editorial cartoon of 1959. His winning panel, entitled "Two Deadly Weapons" depicted a hand holding a revolver and a second hand holding an automobile in the same manner, labeled "reckless speeding driver." Another cartoon on the same subject, which appeared during the holiday season, showed the Biblical Magi on camels following the Star of Bethlehem in the top panel and two colliding cars in the lower panel with the caption "Then...Bethlehem. Today...Mayhem." The Texas Highway Patrol distributed copies of the cartoon instead of warnings in 1960 and partially credited Brooks with a drop in the number of fatalities during the Christmas season.

Brooks' farewell to Walt Disney in 1966 showed dozens of Disney's cartoon characters gathered mournfully at his grave. Thousands of copies were requested from across the country and the original hands at Disney Studios. A 1975 cartoon lambasting Vice President Nelson Rockefeller for ignoring parliamentary procedure during debate of an anti-filibuster bill was passed around the Senate floor. A 1973 "The Wizard of Id" strip, drawn by Brooks' friend Brant Parker, shows an editorial cartoonist named "Charles" being punished by the King for lampooning him. Parker sent a personally inscribed copy to Brooks. A 1976 editorial in The Wall Street Journal referenced a Brooks cartoon entitled "All Things to All People" which showed presidential candidate Jimmy Carter standing at a church pulpit with a Bible in one hand and a copy of Playboy in the other.

Brooks was invited to the White House in 1982 and presented an original of a cartoon making fun of Democratic House Speaker Tip O'Neill to President Ronald Reagan in the Oval Office. Senator John Glenn's wife, Annie, requested the original of another cartoon showing Glenn rowing alone in the center of a river while a donkey leads Walter Mondale, Gary Hart, George McGovern and Jesse Jackson in a larger boat on "the left". Glenn wrote Brooks that it was the best gift his wife had given him and that it was the only cartoon he hung in his office. Former head of the FBI, J. Edgar Hoover, also requested a Brooks original cartoon, which he hung in his office.

He served as president of the Association of American Editorial Cartoonists in 1969 and edited an annual volume of the Best Editorial Cartoons of the Year since 1972 for Pelican Books. He retired from the News in 1985. Since 1982 the University of Alabama at Birmingham's School of Community and Allied Health has presented a "Charles Brooks Award" annually to a graduating senior who made a creative contribution to the school.

== Publications ==
- Brooks, Charles, ed. (May 1972) The Best Editorial Cartoons of 1972. Pelican Publishing Company. ISBN 0-911116-95-8
- Brooks, Charles G., Jr, editor (1986) Best of Brooks: 38 Years of Cartoons. Birmingham: EBSCO Media.
- Brooks, Charles, ed. (February 2007) The Best Editorial Cartoons of the Year: 2007 Edition. Pelican Publishing Company. ISBN 1-58980-459-7
