= WDYF =

- Dothan, Alabama; United States
- Frequency: 90.3 MHz
- Branding: Faith Radio

Programming
- Format: Christian

Ownership
- Owner: Faith Broadcasting, Inc.
- Sister stations: WLBF, WSTF

History
- First air date: 2002
- Call sign meaning: We Deepen Your Faith

Technical information
- Licensing authority: FCC
- Facility ID: 43640
- Class: C2
- ERP: 9,200 watts
- HAAT: 171 meters
- Transmitter coordinates: 31°19′29″N 85°36′06″W

Links
- Public license information: Public file; LMS
- Webcast: Listen live
- Website: www.faithradio.org

WDYF (90.3 FM, "Faith Radio") is a radio station licensed to serve Dothan, Alabama, United States. The station is owned by Faith Broadcasting, Inc. It airs a Christian radio format.

WDYF operates with a main studio waiver that allows it to be a satellite of co-owned non-commercial educational sister station WLBF in Montgomery, Alabama, with its main studio at the WLBF studio location.

== History ==
Originally applied for in April 1993, the station was finally granted a construction permit by the Federal Communications Commission on November 19, 1999. The station was assigned the WDYF call letters by the FCC on March 26, 2001. The FCC granted the station its license to cover on July 10, 2002.
