= WSTF (FM) =

- Andalusia, Alabama; United States
- Frequency: 91.5 MHz
- Branding: Faith Radio

Programming
- Format: Religious

Ownership
- Owner: Faith Broadcasting, Inc.
- Sister stations: WDYF, WLBF

History
- First air date: 1995
- Call sign meaning: We're Saved Through Faith

Technical information
- Licensing authority: FCC
- Facility ID: 43641
- Class: C3
- ERP: 20,500 watts
- HAAT: 110.0 meters
- Transmitter coordinates: 31°26′20″N 86°30′48″W

Links
- Public license information: Public file; LMS
- Webcast: Listen live
- Website: www.faithradio.org

WSTF (91.5 FM, "Faith Radio") is a radio station broadcasting a Religious radio format. Licensed to Andalusia, Alabama, United States. The station is currently owned by Faith Broadcasting, Inc.

The station was assigned the WSTF call letters by the Federal Communications Commission on October 20, 1995.

Before being assigned to this station, WSTF was used from 1985 through 1992 for an adult contemporary radio station at 101.1 FM in Orlando, Florida. That station is now WJRR, an alternative rock station.

In Brewton, a new relay for WSTF signed on in 2–9.2015. This station is located at 92.1 FM and goes by W221DH. (Taken from fccdata.org)

As of 3-17-2016, the 97.1 FM relay for this station, has signed on from their new home in Pensacola Florida and is doing a broadcast of WDWR 1230 AM. (Taken from fccdata.org)

As of 4-28-2016, the 103.5 FM relay for this station, has signed on from their new home in Pensacola Florida, at 103.7 FM and is doing a broadcast of WPNN 790 AM. (Taken from fccdata.org)

== Translators ==
Call sign	Frequency	City of license	FID	ERP (W)	HAAT	Class	FCC info	Notes
W221DH	92.1 FM	Brewton, Alabama	150841	27	80.8 m (265 ft)	D	LMS	Signed On In 2016
