= Andalusia, Alabama =

City in and county seat of Covington County, Alabama

- City
- City of Andalusia
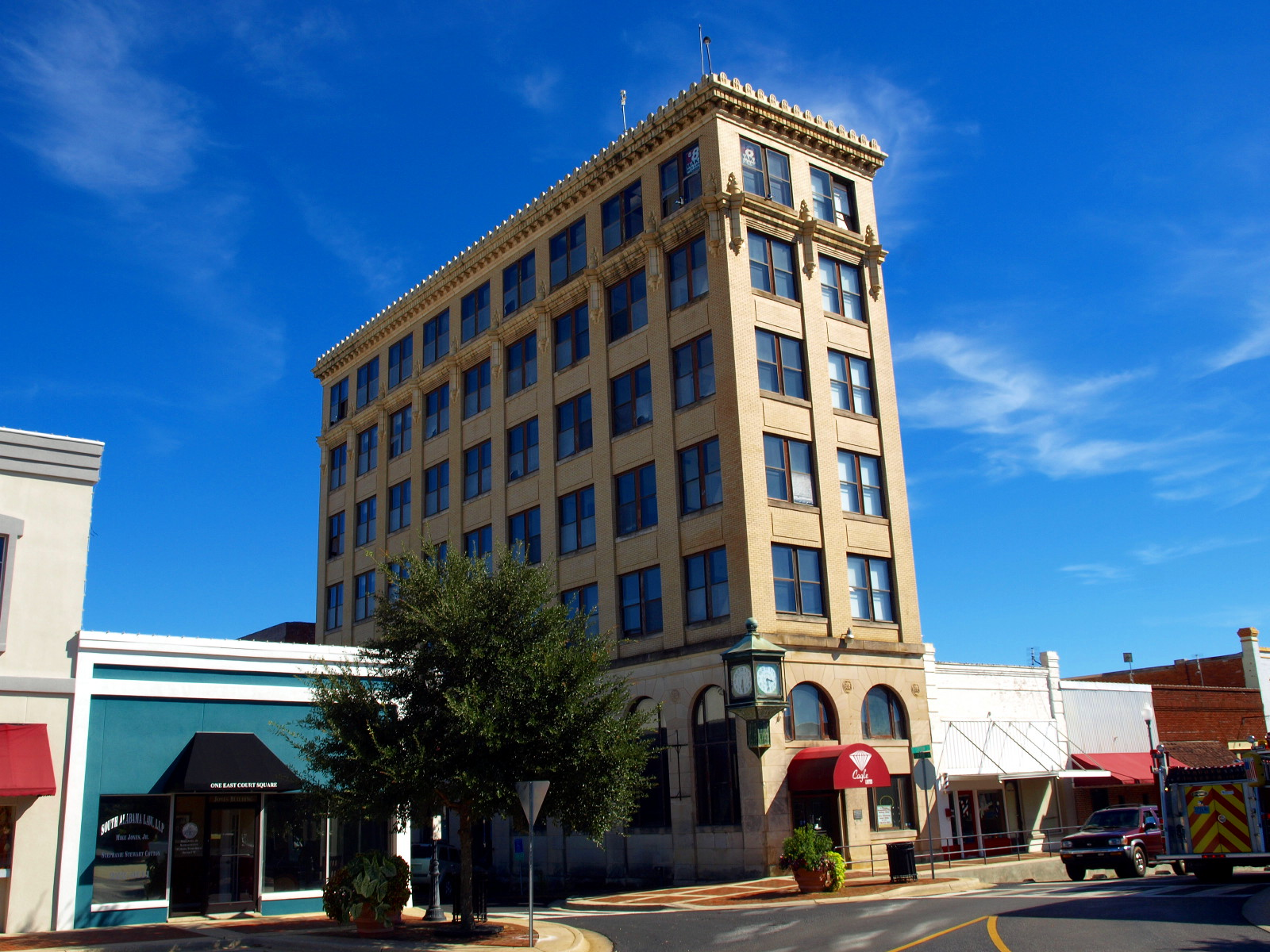
- First National Bank Building, Andalusia, 2014

- Flag Seal
- Motto: "A proud heritage. A progressive future."
- Location of Andalusia in Covington County, Alabama.
- Coordinates: 31°18′36″N 86°29′38″W
- Country: United States
- State: Alabama
- County: Covington
- Settled: 1841
- Incorporated: 1884

Area
  - Total: 19.81 sq mi (51.32 km^{2})
  - Land: 19.66 sq mi (50.91 km^{2})
  - Water: 0.16 sq mi (0.41 km^{2})
- Elevation: 345 ft (105 m)

Population (2020)
  - Total: 8,805
  - Density: 447.9/sq mi (172.95/km^{2})
- Time zone: UTC-6 (CST)
  - Summer (DST): UTC-5 (CDT)
- ZIP code: 36420 and 36421
- Area code: 334
- FIPS code: 01-01708
- GNIS feature ID: 2403097
- Website: Official website

Andalusia is a city in and the county seat of Covington County, Alabama, United States. At the 2020 census, the population was 8,805.

== History ==
Andalusia was settled in 1841 after flooding of the Conecuh River and the surrounding lowlands forced citizens to move to higher ground. The county seat was moved from Montezuma to Andalusia in 1844. Andalusia may have been named by Spanish explorers or settlers since the land where the town is located was part of Spanish Florida until Pinckney's Treaty in 1795. Andalusia shares its name with the autonomous community of Andalusia in southern Spain. The new town was originally called "New Site" but was known as Andalusia by the time a post office was established in 1846.

Andalusia was incorporated as a town in 1884.

In 1899, two railroad lines arrived in Andalusia, the Central of Georgia and the L & N Railroad, and the town began to grow.

The Avant House is one of seven sites in Andalusia listed on the National Register of Historic Places.

== Geography ==
Andalusia is located slightly northwest of the center of Covington County.

According to the U.S. Census Bureau, the city has a total area of 19.8 square miles (51.3 km^{2}), of which 19.7 square miles (50.9 km^{2}) is land and 0.15 square miles (0.4 km^{2}), or 0.79%, is water.

Andalusia is served by the South Alabama Regional Airport, formerly known as the Andalusia-Opp Airport, located approximately 5 miles (8 km) east of the central business district.

=== Climate ===
The climate in this area is characterized by hot, humid summers and generally mild to cool winters. According to the Köppen Climate Classification system, Andalusia has a humid subtropical climate, abbreviated "Cfa" on climate maps.

Climate data for Andalusia, Alabama, 1991–2020 normals, extremes 1912–2018
Month	Jan	Feb	Mar	Apr	May	Jun	Jul	Aug	Sep	Oct	Nov	Dec	Year
Record high °F (°C)	84 (29)	87 (31)	89 (32)	97 (36)	100 (38)	105 (41)	105 (41)	105 (41)	101 (38)	99 (37)	88 (31)	84 (29)	105 (41)
Mean maximum °F (°C)	75.0 (23.9)	77.3 (25.2)	83.7 (28.7)	87.5 (30.8)	92.3 (33.5)	96.3 (35.7)	97.6 (36.4)	97.0 (36.1)	94.4 (34.7)	89.2 (31.8)	82.8 (28.2)	77.3 (25.2)	98.7 (37.1)
Mean daily maximum °F (°C)	60.5 (15.8)	64.6 (18.1)	71.5 (21.9)	77.7 (25.4)	84.2 (29.0)	89.0 (31.7)	90.6 (32.6)	90.2 (32.3)	86.9 (30.5)	79.1 (26.2)	70.0 (21.1)	62.8 (17.1)	77.3 (25.1)
Daily mean °F (°C)	47.9 (8.8)	51.5 (10.8)	57.8 (14.3)	63.9 (17.7)	71.6 (22.0)	78.3 (25.7)	80.4 (26.9)	80.1 (26.7)	76.0 (24.4)	66.0 (18.9)	55.7 (13.2)	50.0 (10.0)	64.9 (18.3)
Mean daily minimum °F (°C)	35.2 (1.8)	38.3 (3.5)	44.0 (6.7)	50.1 (10.1)	59.1 (15.1)	67.6 (19.8)	70.2 (21.2)	70.0 (21.1)	65.1 (18.4)	52.9 (11.6)	41.5 (5.3)	37.3 (2.9)	52.6 (11.5)
Mean minimum °F (°C)	17.9 (−7.8)	21.3 (−5.9)	26.2 (−3.2)	32.7 (0.4)	43.8 (6.6)	55.4 (13.0)	62.3 (16.8)	62.1 (16.7)	49.2 (9.6)	34.0 (1.1)	27.0 (−2.8)	19.8 (−6.8)	14.6 (−9.7)
Record low °F (°C)	0 (−18)	10 (−12)	16 (−9)	27 (−3)	34 (1)	44 (7)	50 (10)	54 (12)	34 (1)	28 (−2)	16 (−9)	2 (−17)	0 (−18)
Average precipitation inches (mm)	5.19 (132)	4.62 (117)	4.97 (126)	4.86 (123)	4.32 (110)	5.65 (144)	6.21 (158)	6.34 (161)	5.14 (131)	3.40 (86)	4.11 (104)	5.45 (138)	60.26 (1,530)
Average snowfall inches (cm)	0.0 (0.0)	0.0 (0.0)	0.3 (0.76)	0.0 (0.0)	0.0 (0.0)	0.0 (0.0)	0.0 (0.0)	0.0 (0.0)	0.0 (0.0)	0.0 (0.0)	0.0 (0.0)	0.0 (0.0)	0.3 (0.76)
Average precipitation days (≥ 0.01 in)	7.8	6.7	7.0	6.2	6.4	9.2	10.9	9.4	6.8	4.2	5.6	6.7	86.9
Source: NOAA (mean maxima/minima 1981–2010)

== Demographics ==
Historical population
Census	Pop.	Note	%±
1880	596		—
1890	270		−54.7%
1900	551		104.1%
1910	2,480		350.1%
1920	4,023		62.2%
1930	5,154		28.1%
1940	6,886		33.6%
1950	9,162		33.1%
1960	10,263		12.0%
1970	10,092		−1.7%
1980	10,415		3.2%
1990	9,269		−11.0%
2000	8,794		−5.1%
2010	9,015		2.5%
2020	8,805		−2.3%
U.S. Decennial Census

Andalusia first appeared on the 1880 U.S. Census as an unincorporated village. It formally incorporated in 1884. See Andalusia Precinct/Division below.

=== Racial and ethnic composition ===
Andalusia city, Alabama – Racial and ethnic composition Note: the US Census treats Hispanic/Latino as an ethnic category. This table excludes Latinos from the racial categories and assigns them to a separate category. Hispanics/Latinos may be of any race.
Race / Ethnicity (NH = Non-Hispanic)	Pop 1980	Pop 1990	Pop 2000	Pop 2010	Pop 2020	% 1980	% 1990	% 2000	% 2010	% 2020
White alone (NH)	8,100	7,067	6,455	6,262	5,829	77.77%	76.24%	73.40%	69.46%	66.20%
Black or African American alone (NH)	2,177	2,114	2,146	2,315	2,270	20.90%	22.81%	24.40%	25.68%	25.78%
Native American or Alaska Native alone (NH)	4	28	32	34	30	0.04%	0.30%	0.36%	0.38%	0.34%
Asian alone (NH)	38	13	24	87	114	0.36%	0.14%	0.27%	0.97%	1.29%
Native Hawaiian or Pacific Islander alone (NH)	x	x	2	0	0	x	x	0.02%	0.00%	0.00%
Other race alone (NH)	5	0	2	7	29	0.05%	0.00%	0.02%	0.08%	0.33%
Mixed race or Multiracial (NH)	x	x	64	143	330	x	x	0.73%	1.59%	3.75%
Hispanic or Latino (any race)	91	47	69	167	203	0.87%	0.51%	0.78%	1.85%	2.31%
Total	10,415	9,269	8,794	9,015	8,805	100.00%	100.00%	100.00%	100.00%	100.00%

=== 2020 census ===
As of the 2020 census, Andalusia had a population of 8,805. The median age was 40.6 years. 22.3% of residents were under the age of 18 and 20.9% of residents were 65 years of age or older. For every 100 females there were 88.1 males, and for every 100 females age 18 and over there were 82.2 males age 18 and over.

There were 3,667 households in Andalusia, of which 28.9% had children under the age of 18 living in them. Of all households, 36.5% were married-couple households, 19.3% were households with a male householder and no spouse or partner present, and 38.6% were households with a female householder and no spouse or partner present. About 35.7% of all households were made up of individuals, 16.5% had someone living alone who was 65 years of age or older, and there were 2,147 families residing in the city.

There were 4,335 housing units, of which 15.4% were vacant. The homeowner vacancy rate was 3.8% and the rental vacancy rate was 11.8%.

72.6% of residents lived in urban areas, while 27.4% lived in rural areas.

=== 2010 census ===
At the 2010 census there were 9,015 people in 3,694 households, including 2,359 families, in the city. The racial makeup of the city was 70.5% White, 25.9% Black or African American, 0.4% Native American, 1.0% Asian, 0.0% Pacific Islander, 0.4% from other races, and 1.7% from two or more races. 1.9% of the population were Hispanic or Latino of any race. Of the 3,694 households 26.7% had children under the age of 18 living with them, 40.9% were married couples living together, 18.3% had a female householder with no husband present, and 36.1% were non-families. 31.3% of households were one person and 14.9% were one person aged 65 or older. The average household size was 2.35 and the average family size was 2.93.

The age distribution was 23.4% under the age of 18, 9.2% from 18 to 24, 23.6% from 25 to 44, 25.1% from 45 to 64, and 18.7% 65 or older. The median age was 39.7 years. For every 100 females, there were 86.6 males. For every 100 females age 18 and over, there were 91.2 males.

The median household income was $28,049 and the median family income was $37,059. Males had a median income of $27,228 versus $25,855 for females. The per capita income for the city was $19,544. About 20.2% of families and 22.8% of the population were below the poverty line, including 35.4% of those under age 18 and 14.5% of those age 65 or over.

=== 2000 census ===
As of the census of 2000, there were 8,794 people in 3,707 households, including 2,376 families, in the city. The population density was 465.9 inhabitants per square mile (179.9/km^{2}). There were 4,279 housing units at an average density of 226.7 per square mile (87.5/km^{2}). The racial makeup of the city was 73.93% White, 24.47% Black or African American, 0.36% Native American, 0.27% Asian, 0.02% Pacific Islander, 0.18% from other races, and 0.76% from two or more races. 0.78% of the population were Hispanic or Latino of any race.

Of the 3,707 households 27.9% had children under the age of 18 living with them, 46.5% were married couples living together, 14.4% had a female householder with no husband present, and 35.9% were non-families. 33.3% of households were one person and 17.1% were one person aged 65 or older. The average household size was 2.29 and the average family size was 2.91.

The age distribution was 23.2% under the age of 18, 8.4% from 18 to 24, 25.0% from 25 to 44, 22.6% from 45 to 64, and 20.8% 65 or older. The median age was 40 years. For every 100 females, there were 84.4 males. For every 100 females age 18 and over, there were 79.5 males.

The median household income was $26,856 and the median family income was $37,091. Males had a median income of $29,406 versus $20,410 for females. The per capita income for the city was $17,292. About 15.7% of families and 20.6% of the population were below the poverty line, including 28.6% of those under age 18 and 18.9% of those age 65 or over.

== Andalusia Precinct/Division (1880-) ==
Historical population
Census	Pop.	Note	%±
1880	729		—
1890	1,371		88.1%
1900	2,051		49.6%
1910	4,388		113.9%
1920	6,057		38.0%
1930	7,680		26.8%
1940	9,647		25.6%
1950	10,882		12.8%
1960	10,263		−5.7%
1970	10,092		−1.7%
1980	18,168		80.0%
1990	18,275		0.6%
2000	18,646		2.0%
2010	18,495		−0.8%
U.S. Decennial Census

Andalusia Beat (Precinct) (Covington County 1st Beat) first appeared on the 1880 U.S. Census. In 1890, "beat" was changed to "precinct." In 1960, the precinct was changed to "census division" as part of a general reorganization of counties. In 1980, three additional census divisions were consolidated into Andalusia, including Andalusia East, Andalusia West and Red Level.

== Andalusia East Census Division (1960-70) ==
Historical population
Census	Pop.	Note	%±
1960	2,859		—
1970	2,608		−8.8%
U.S. Decennial Census

Andalusia East Census Division was created in 1960 and contained the towns of Babbie, Heath, Libertyville and Sanford. In 1980, it was consolidated into Andalusia Census Division.

== Andalusia West Census Division (1960-70) ==
Historical population
Census	Pop.	Note	%±
1960	2,014		—
1970	1,576		−21.7%
U.S. Decennial Census

Andalusia West Census Division was created in 1960. It did not contain any incorporated communities, and included the rural area west of the city of Andalusia to the Conecuh County line. In 1980, it was consolidated into Andalusia Census Division.

== Media ==
- Cable TV Station
- WKNI 25 community interests
- Radio stations
  - WAAO-FM 93.7 FM (Country)
  - WSTF 91.5 FM (Religious)
  - WFXX FOX 107.7 FM (Adult Contemporary)
- Newspaper
  - Andalusia Star-News (daily)

== City Council ==
District	Name	Position
1	Mr. Joe Nix	Member
2	Mr. Kennith Mount	President
3	Mrs. Hazel Griffin	Member
4	Mr. Presley Boswell	Member
5	Mr. Terry Powell	Mayor Pro Tempore

== Education ==
Primary and secondary public education is provided by the Andalusia City Schools school district, which covers the entire city limits. The district consists of Andalusia Elementary School (Pre-K through 6th Grade), Andalusia Jr. High School (7th and 8th Grade), and Andalusia High School (9th through 12th Grade). Students can continue their studies at Lurleen B. Wallace Community College.

== Transportation ==
Intercity bus service is provided by Greyhound Lines. Local dial-a-ride transit service is provided by Covington Area Transit Service.

== Sites on the National Register of Historic Places ==
- The Bank of Andalusia
- Avant House
- Central of Georgia Depot, now converted into the Three Notch Museum
- Covington County Courthouse and Jail
- First National Bank Building

On July 4, 1975, a plaque monument was placed in front of the Covington County Courthouse by the Altrusa Club, as part of the commemoration of the United States Bicentennial. The plaque read "In memory of PHILIP NOLAN, Lieutenant in the Army of the United States. He loved his country as no other man has loved her; but no man deserved less at her hands." Nolan is the protagonist of American writer Edward Everett Hale's fictional short story "The Man Without a Country", first published in The Atlantic in December 1863, during the Civil War.

== Notable people ==
- Harold Albritton, U.S. district court judge
- Dempsey Barron, President of the Florida Senate from 1975 to 1976
- Charles Brooks, editorial cartoonist
- James U. Cross, U.S. Air Force brigadier general
- Cecil O. De Loach, Jr., California grape-grower and winemaker
- Quinton Dial, defensive tackle for the Alabama Crimson Tide
- Irwin Gunsalus, biochemist; assistant secretary general at the United Nations
- Seth Hammett, Speaker of the Alabama House of Representatives
- Robert Horry, 7 time NBA champion
- Nico Johnson, the University of Alabama football team member
- Alexa Jones, Miss Alabama 2005 and Miss America 2006 (second runner-up)
- T. D. Little, member of Alabama Senate and House of Representatives
- Lamar Morris, country music singer
- Mackey Sasser, former MLB catcher
- Frank J. Tipler, mathematical physicist and cosmologist

== Gallery ==
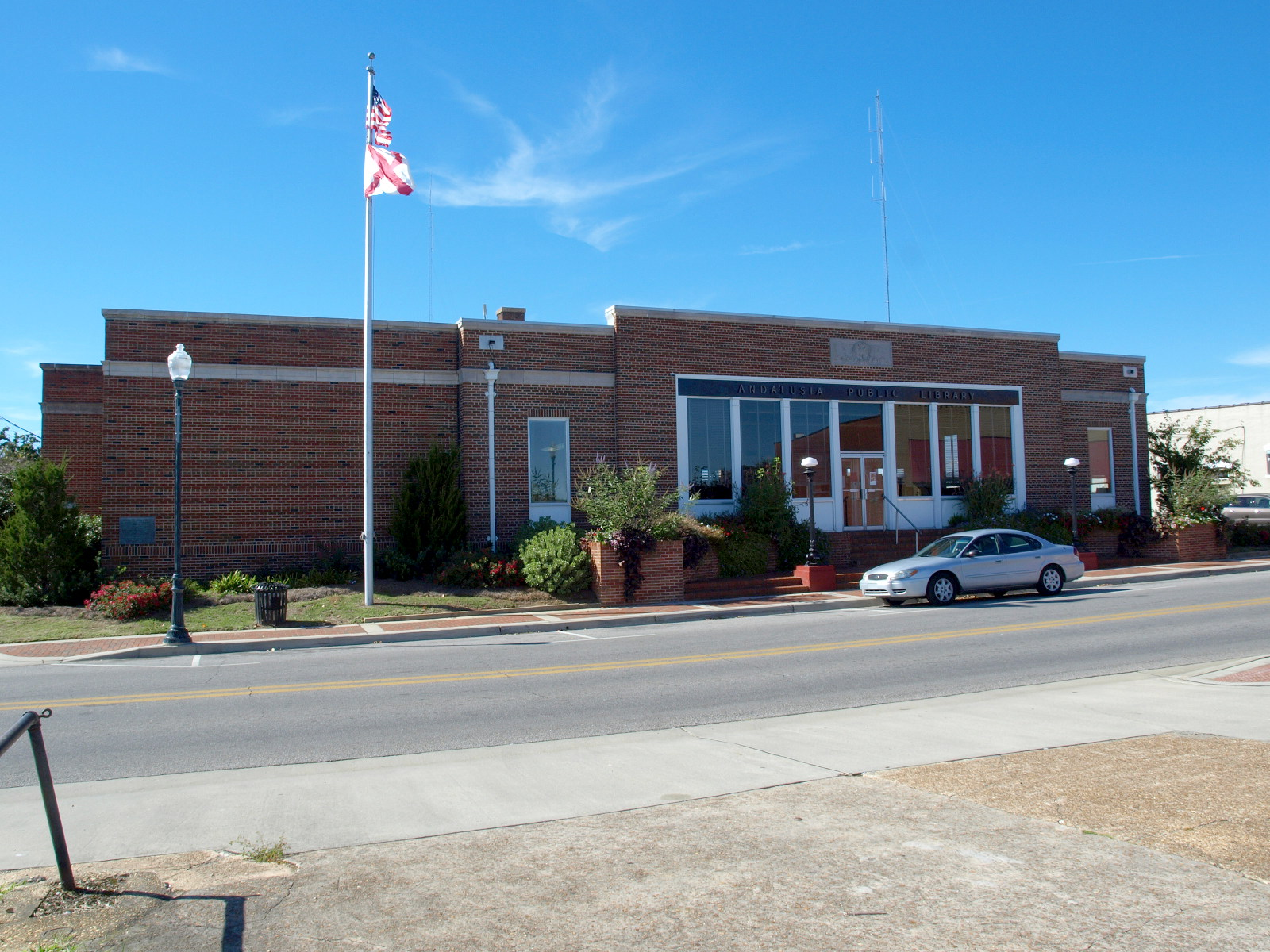
Andalusia Public Library, 2014

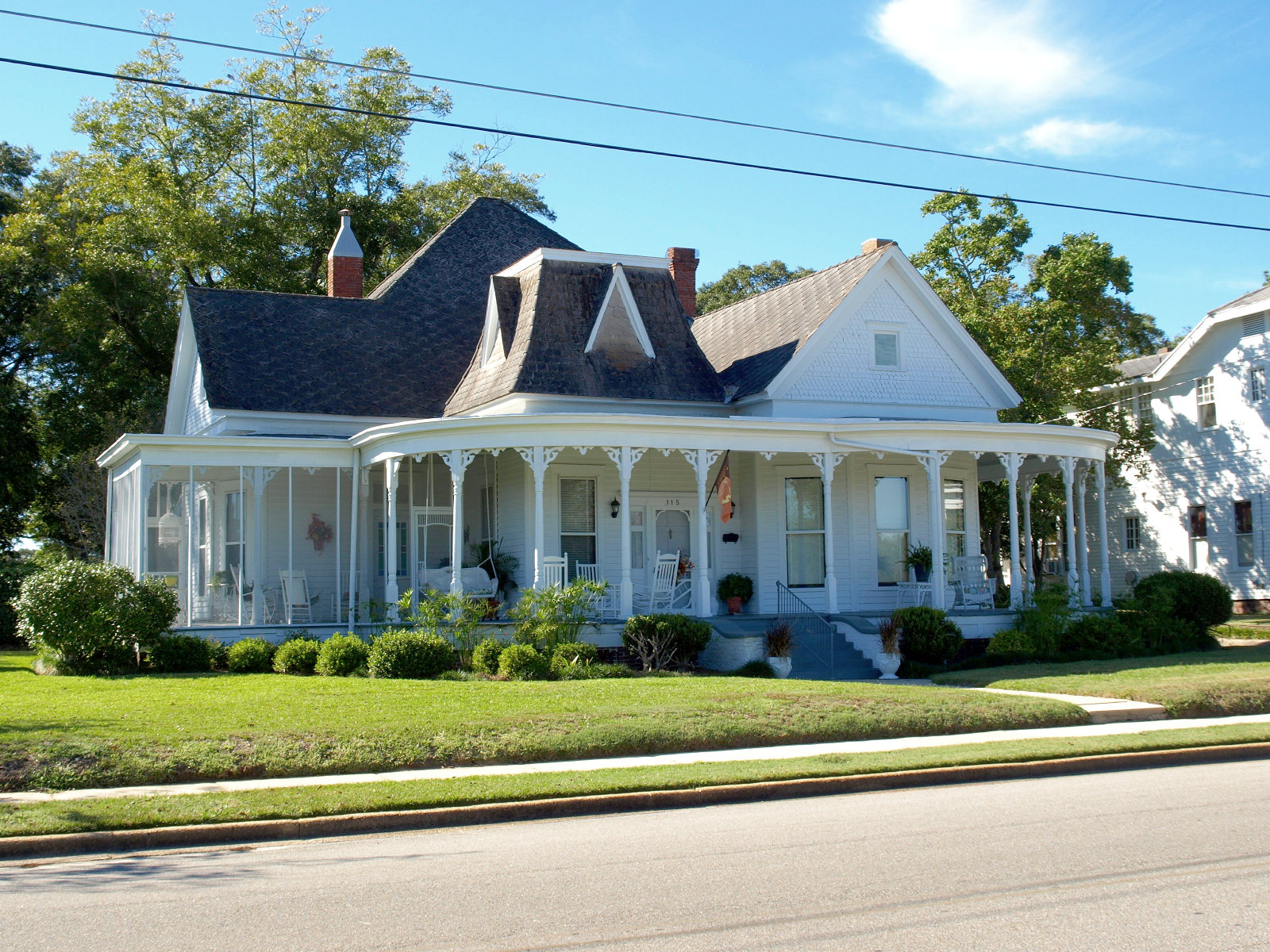
115 Sixth Avenue, Andalusia

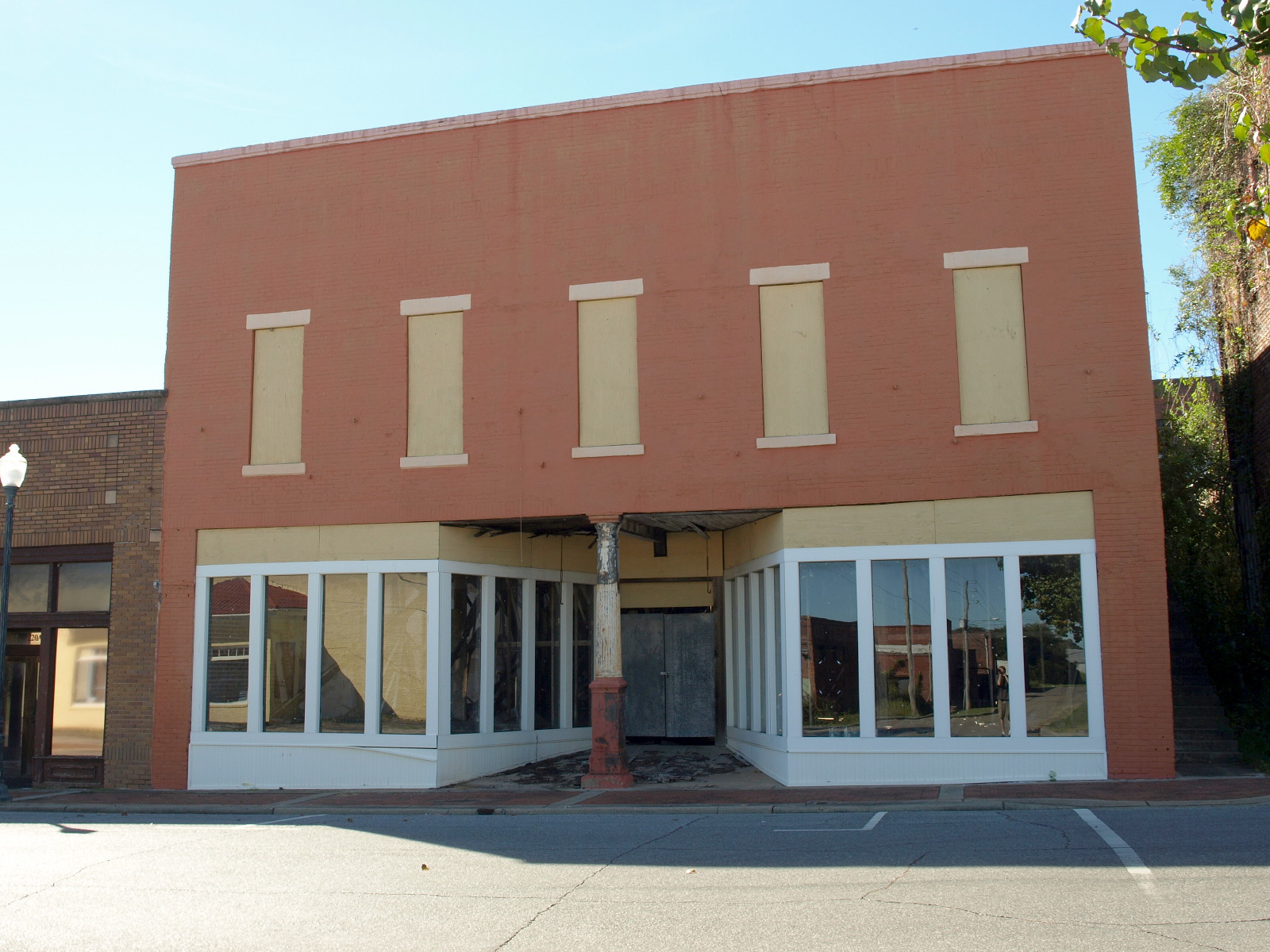
208 S. Cotton Street, Andalusia

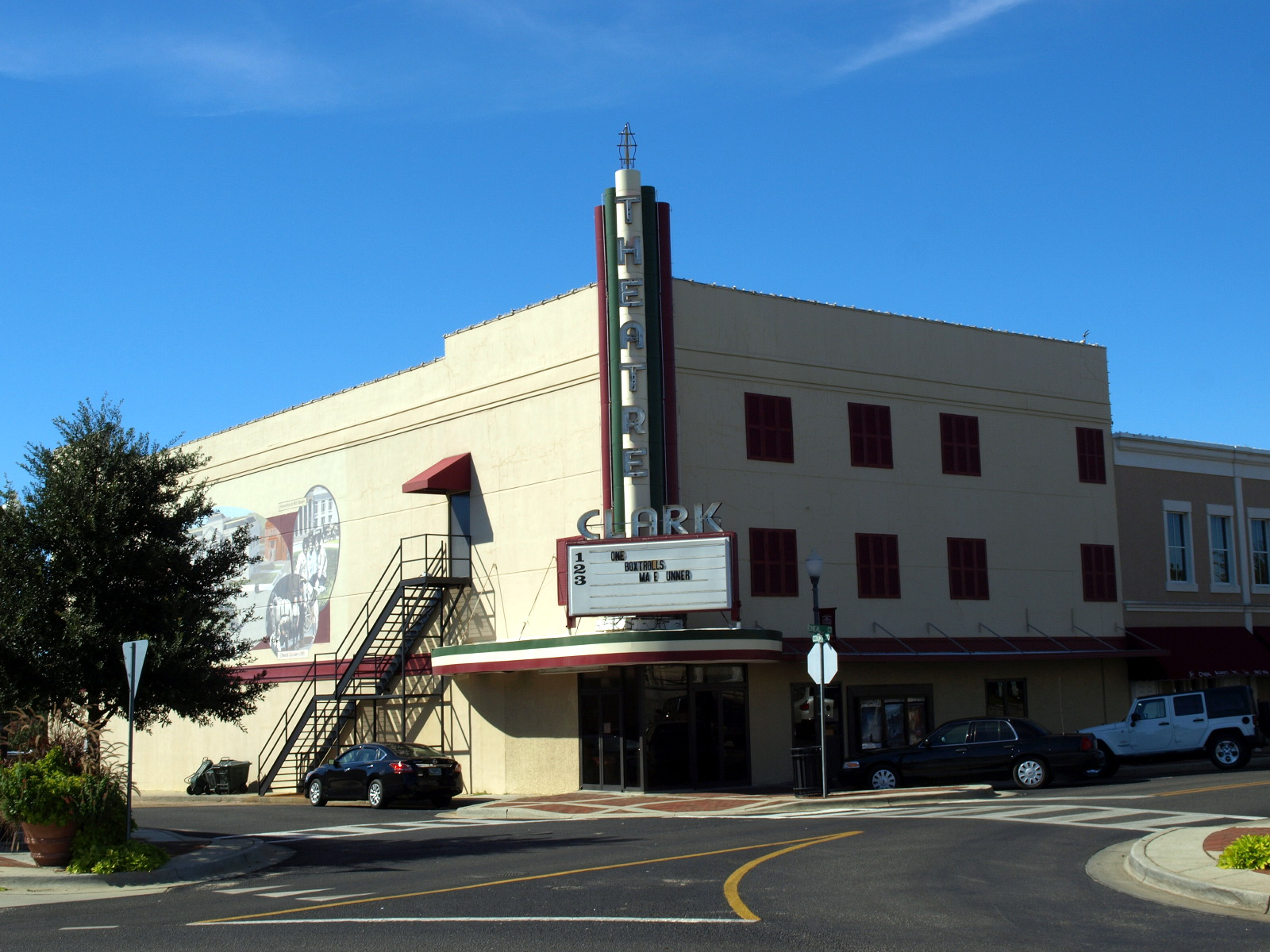
Clark Theatre, Andalusia

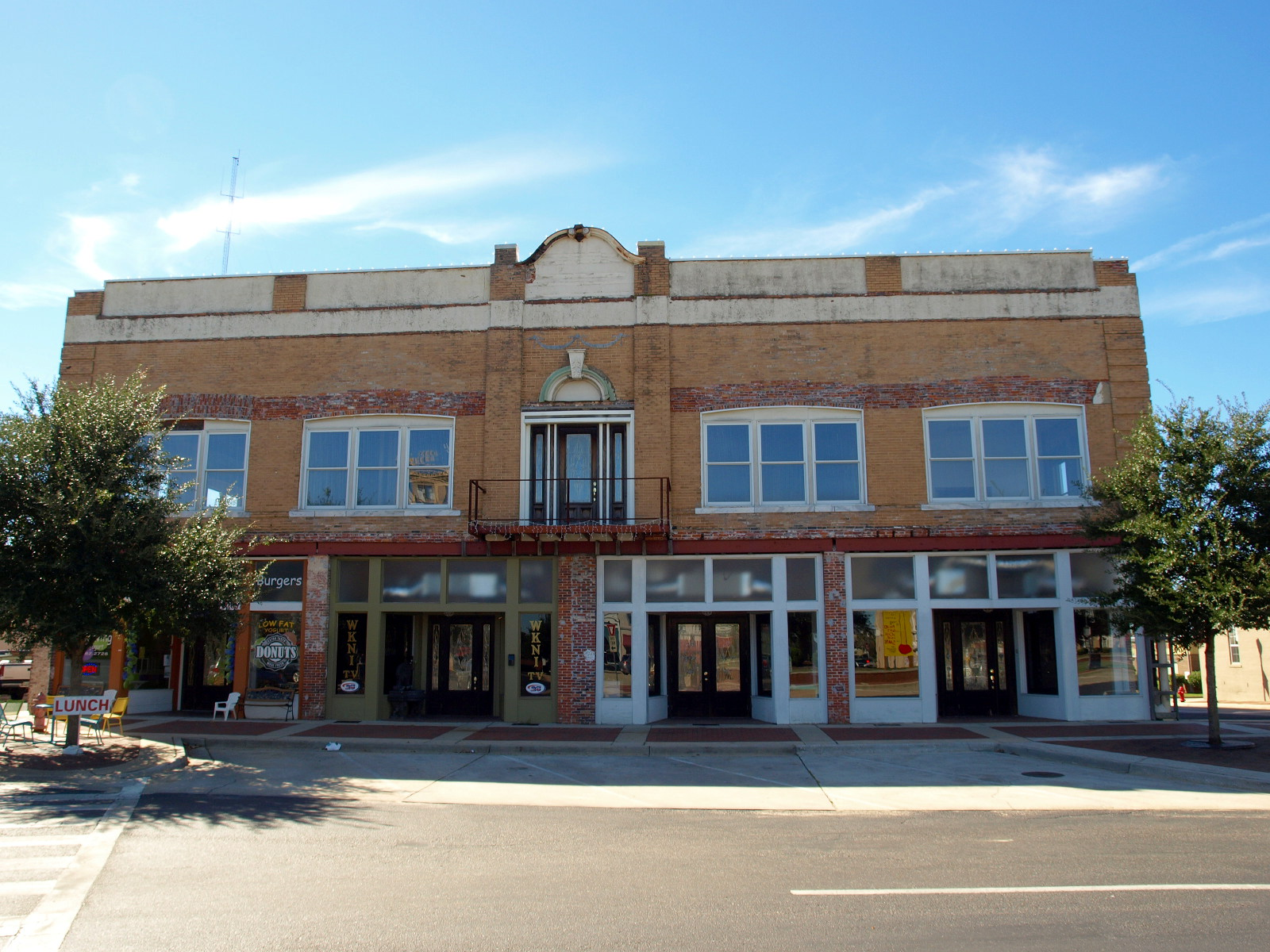
8-14 Court Square, Andalusia

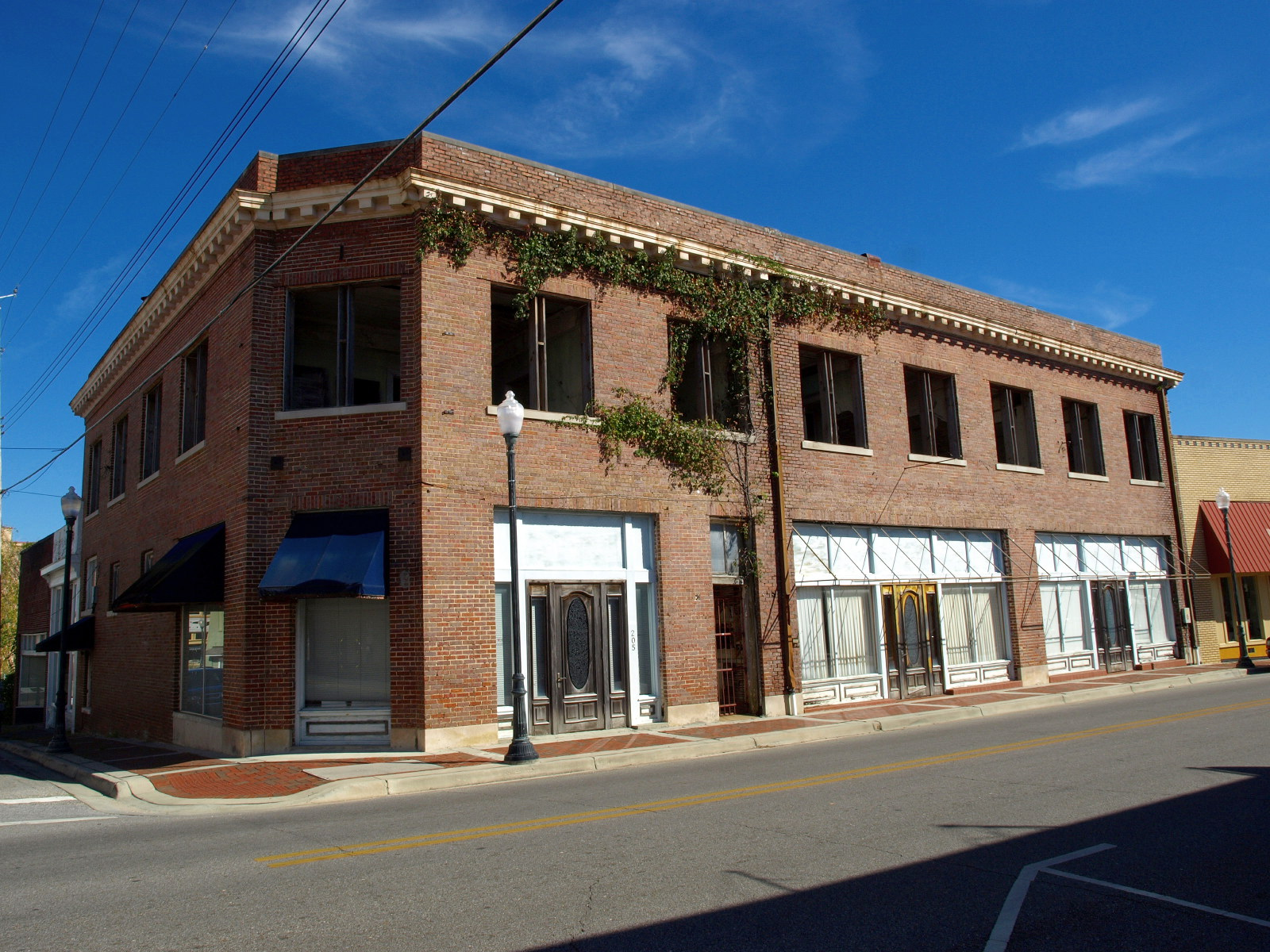
201 South Three Notch Street, Andalusia

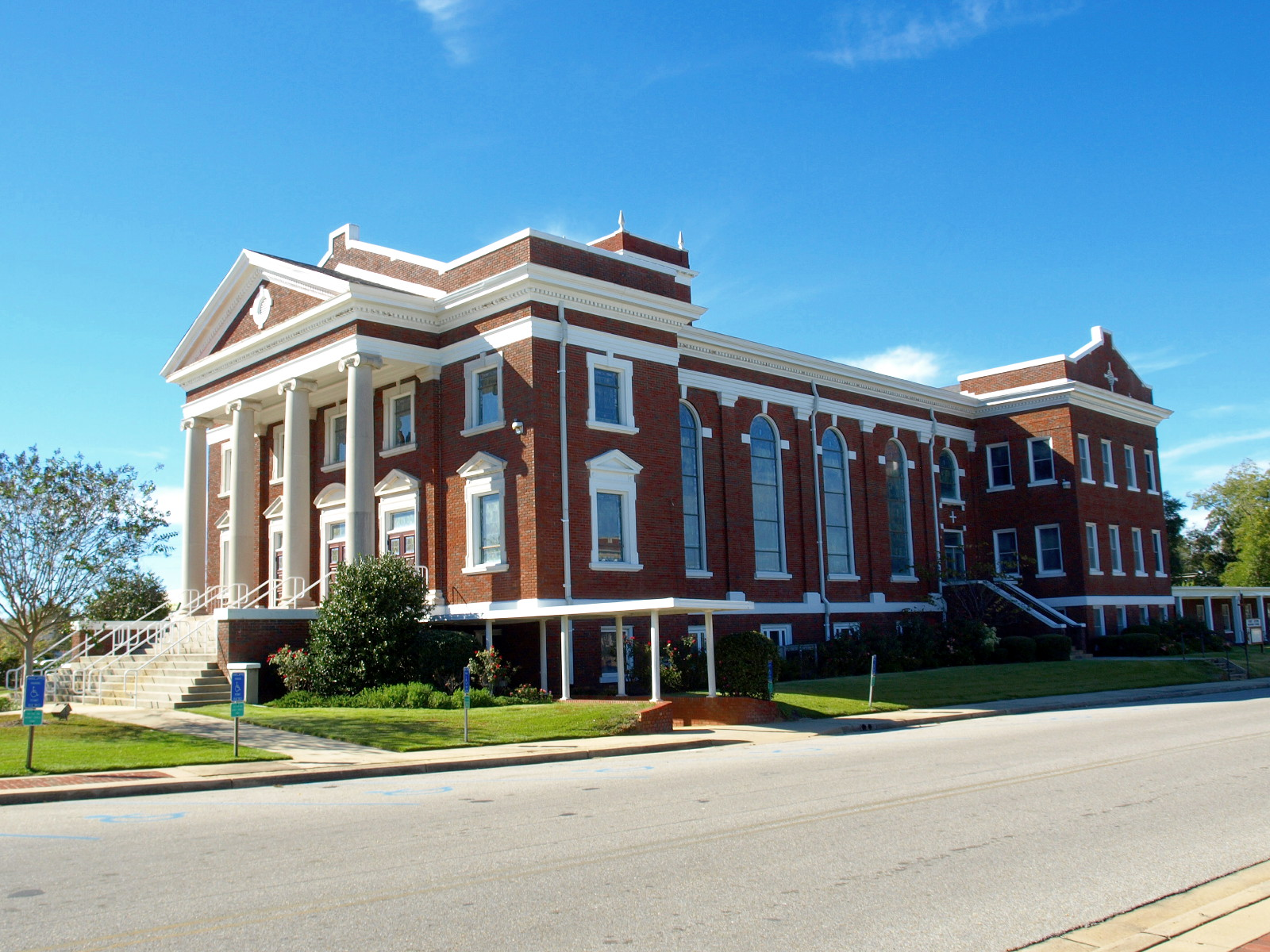
First United Methodist, Andalusia

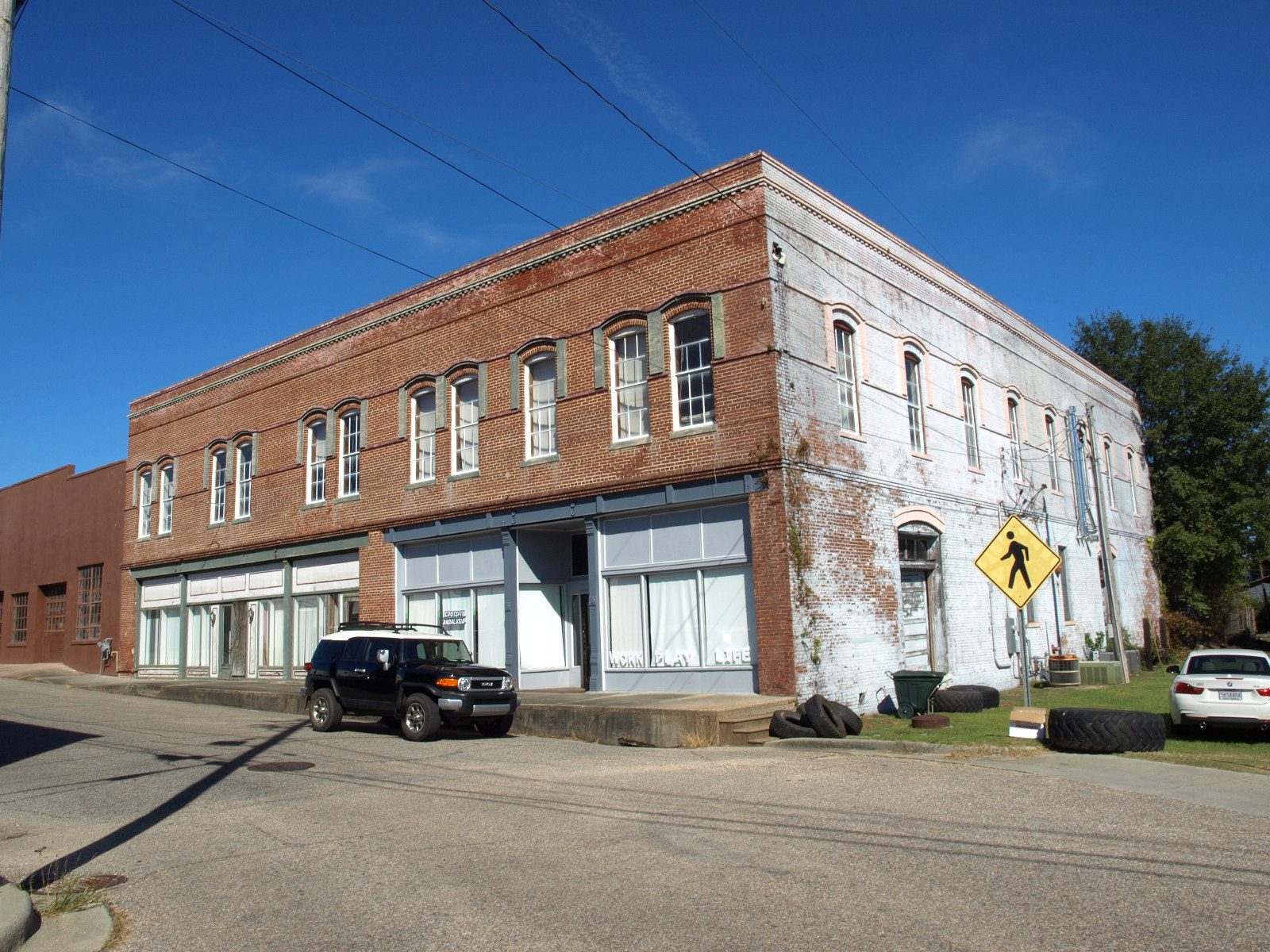
121 Central Street, Andalusia

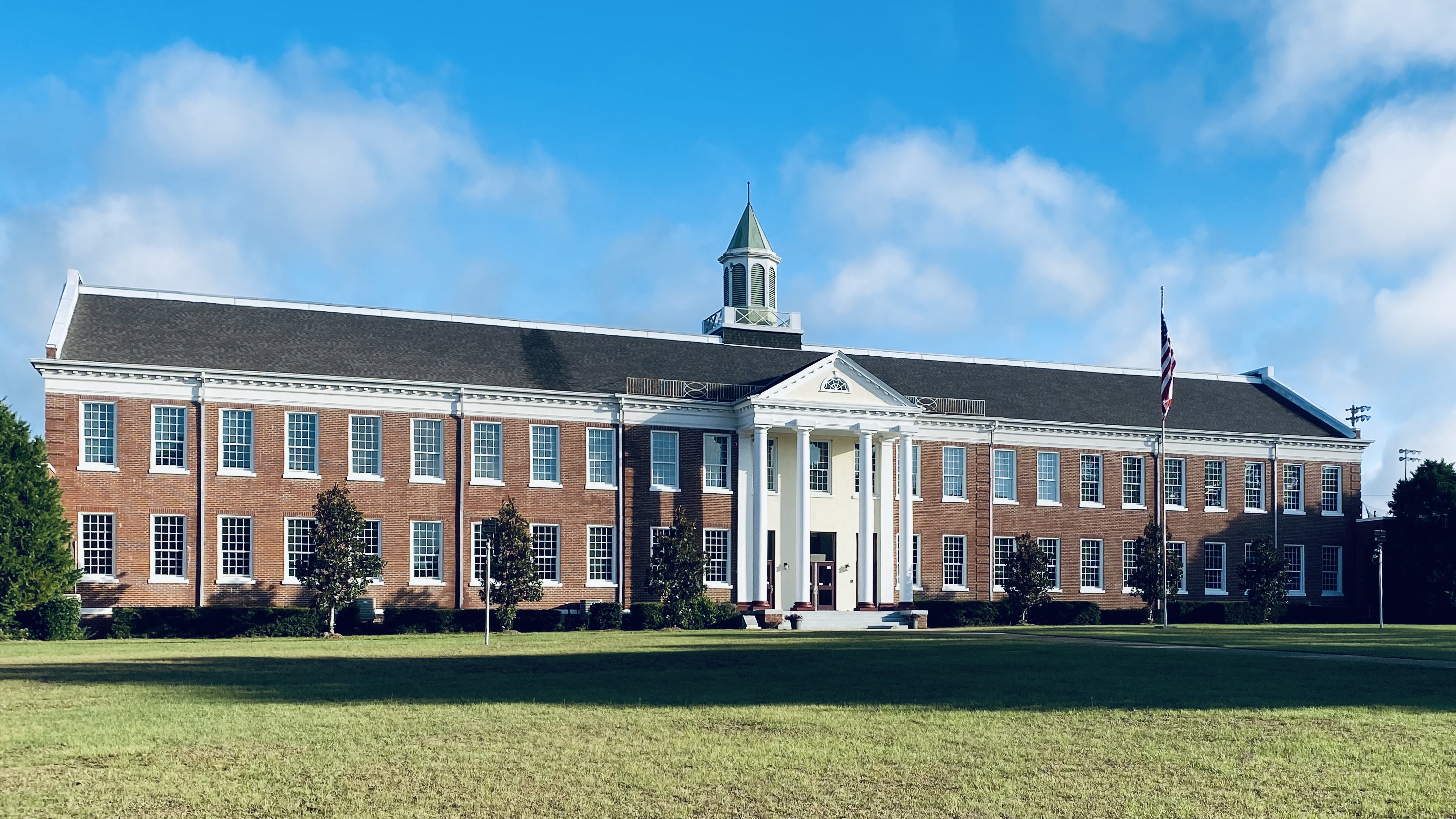
Andalusia High School

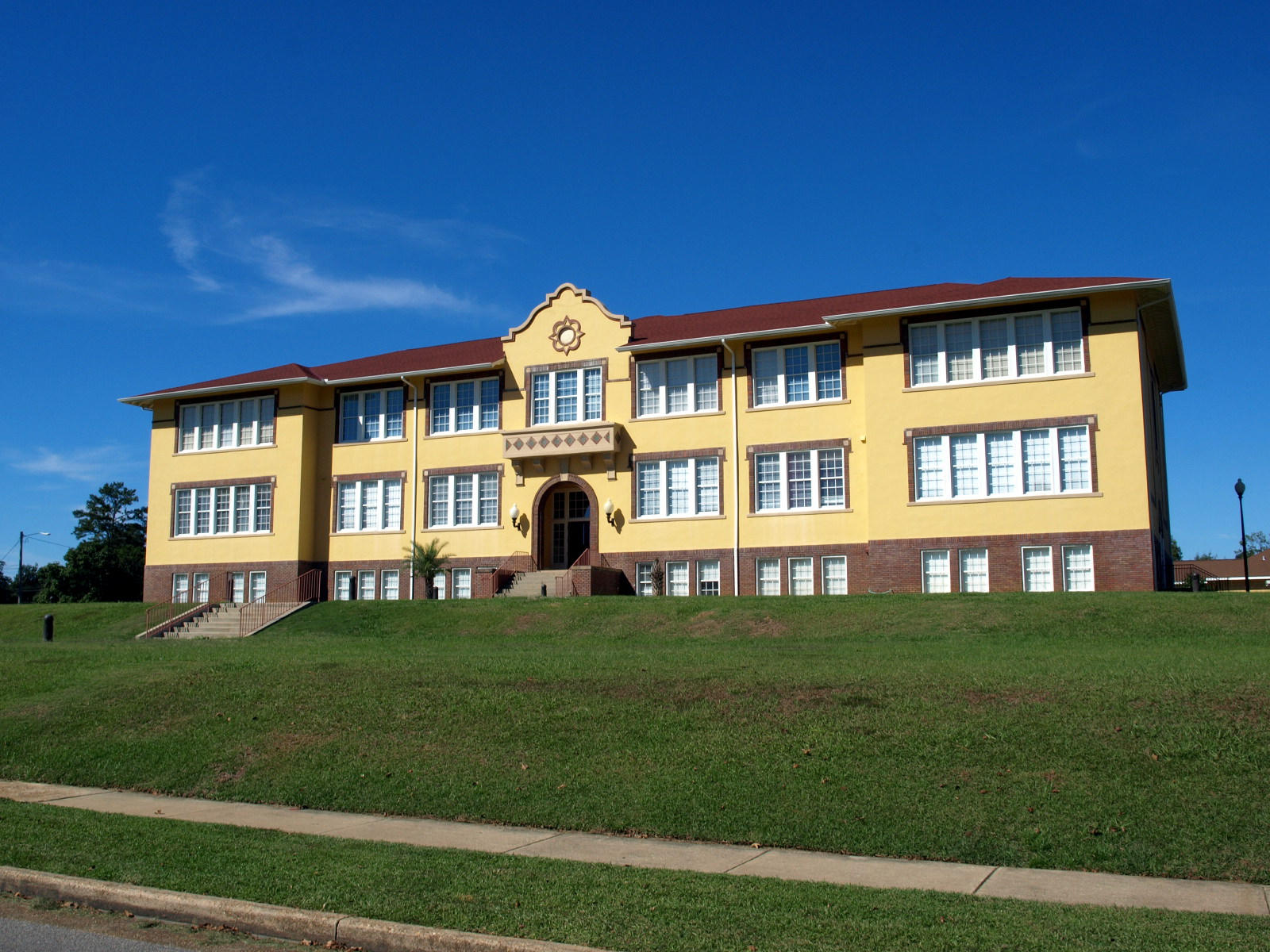
Andalusia Ballet School (formerly Church Street School), Andalusia

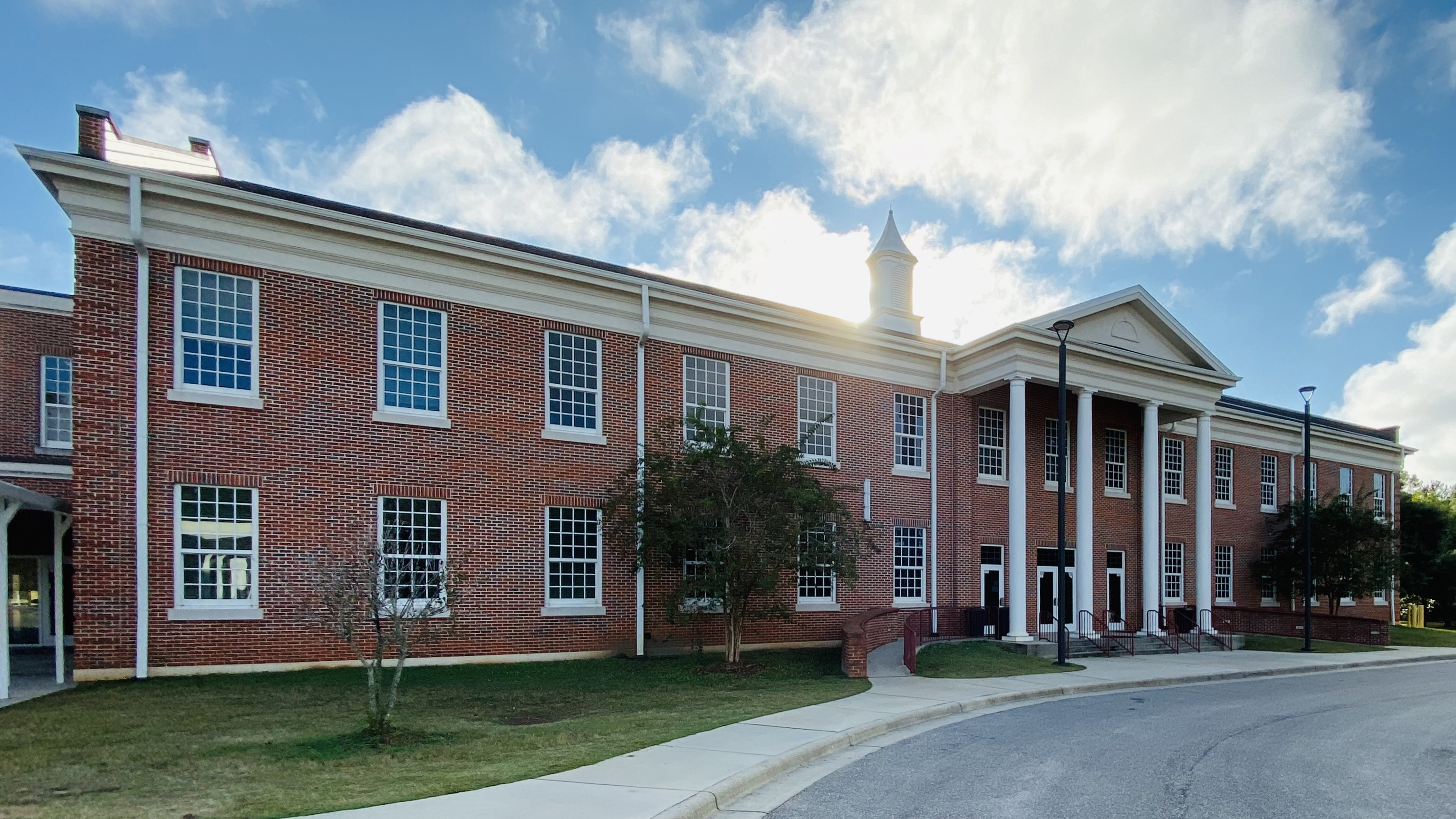
Andalusia Junior High School

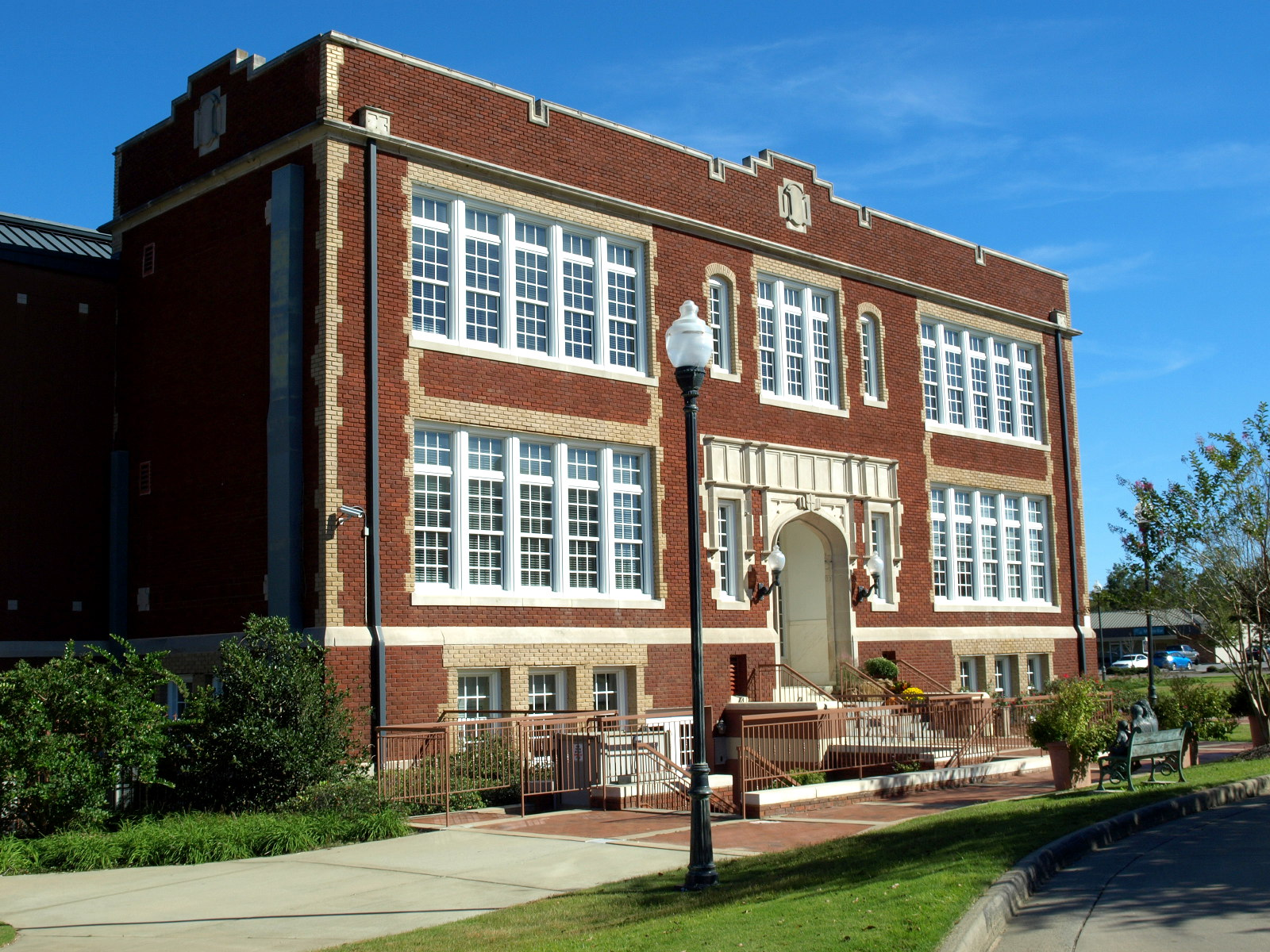
Andalusia City Hall

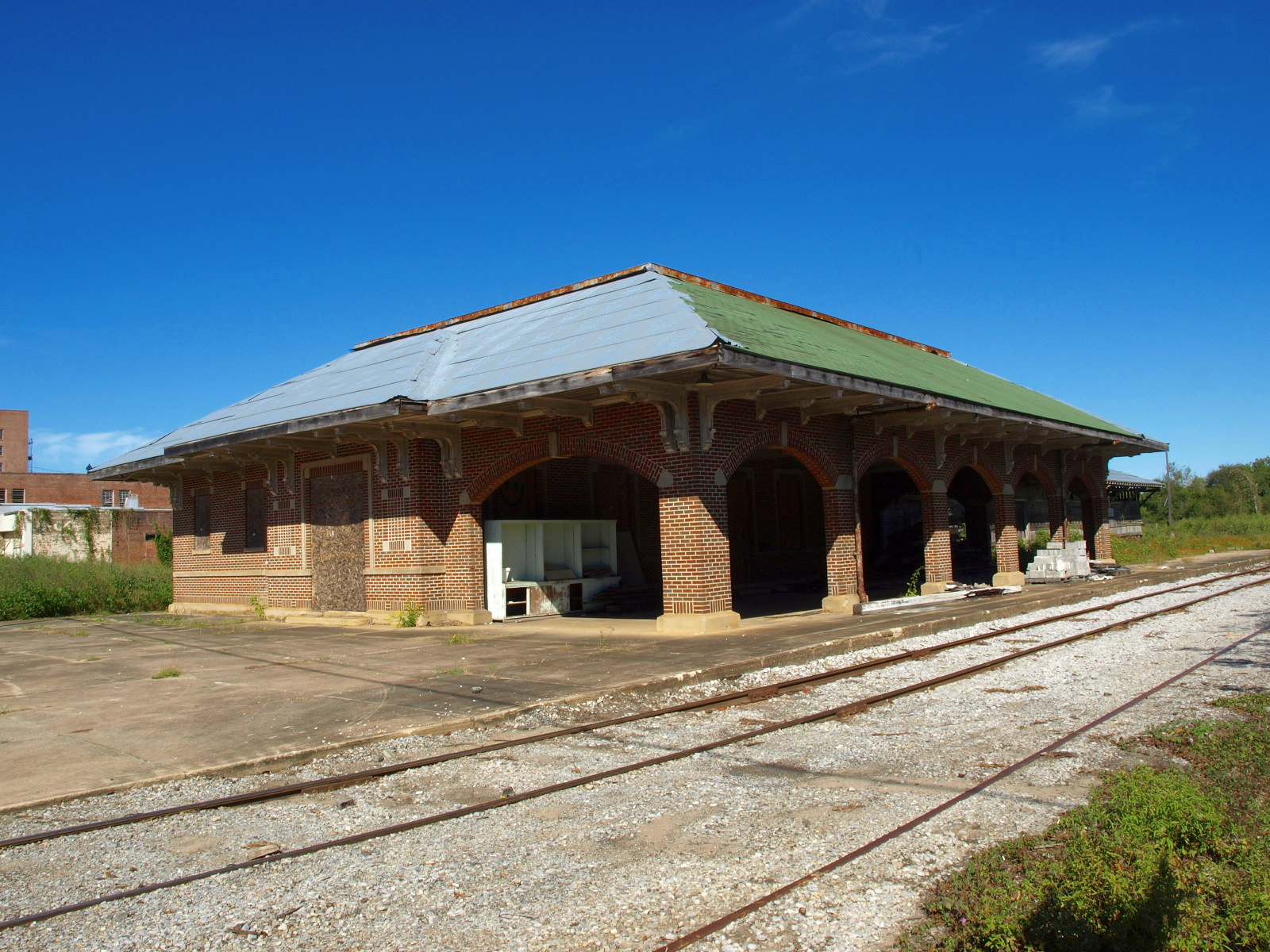
Old L&N Depot, Andalusia

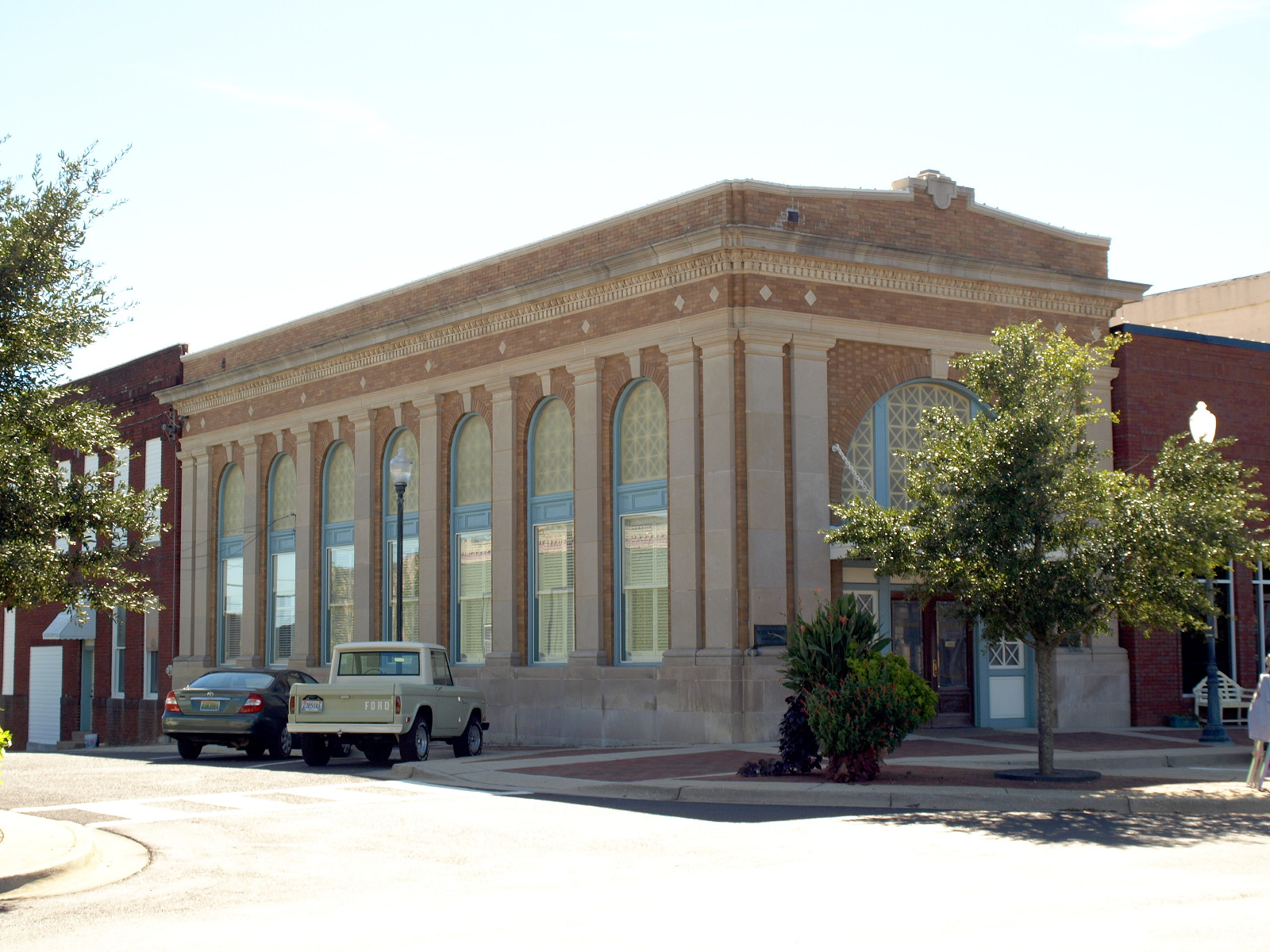
Bank of Andalusia

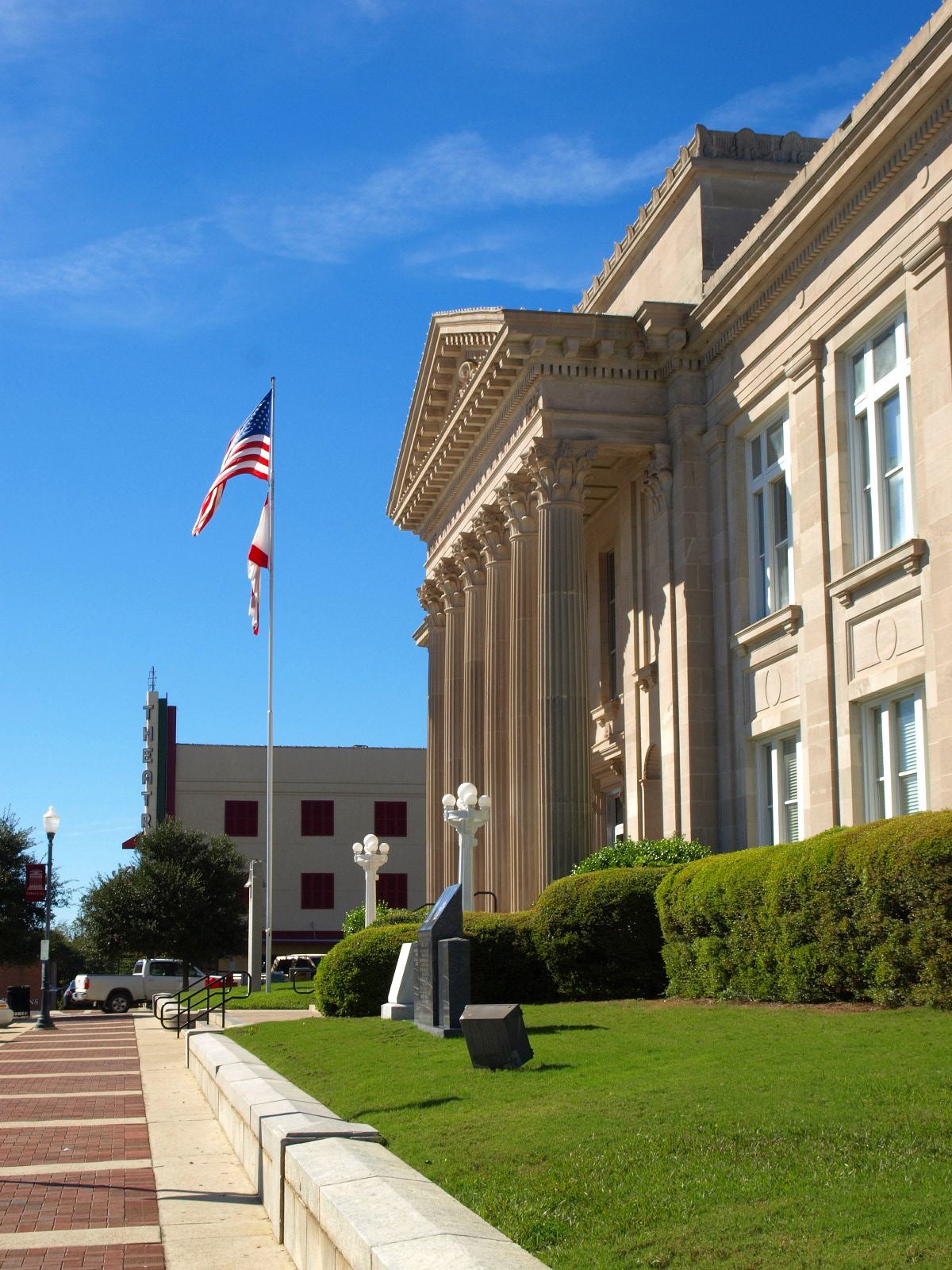
Covington County Alabama Courthouse

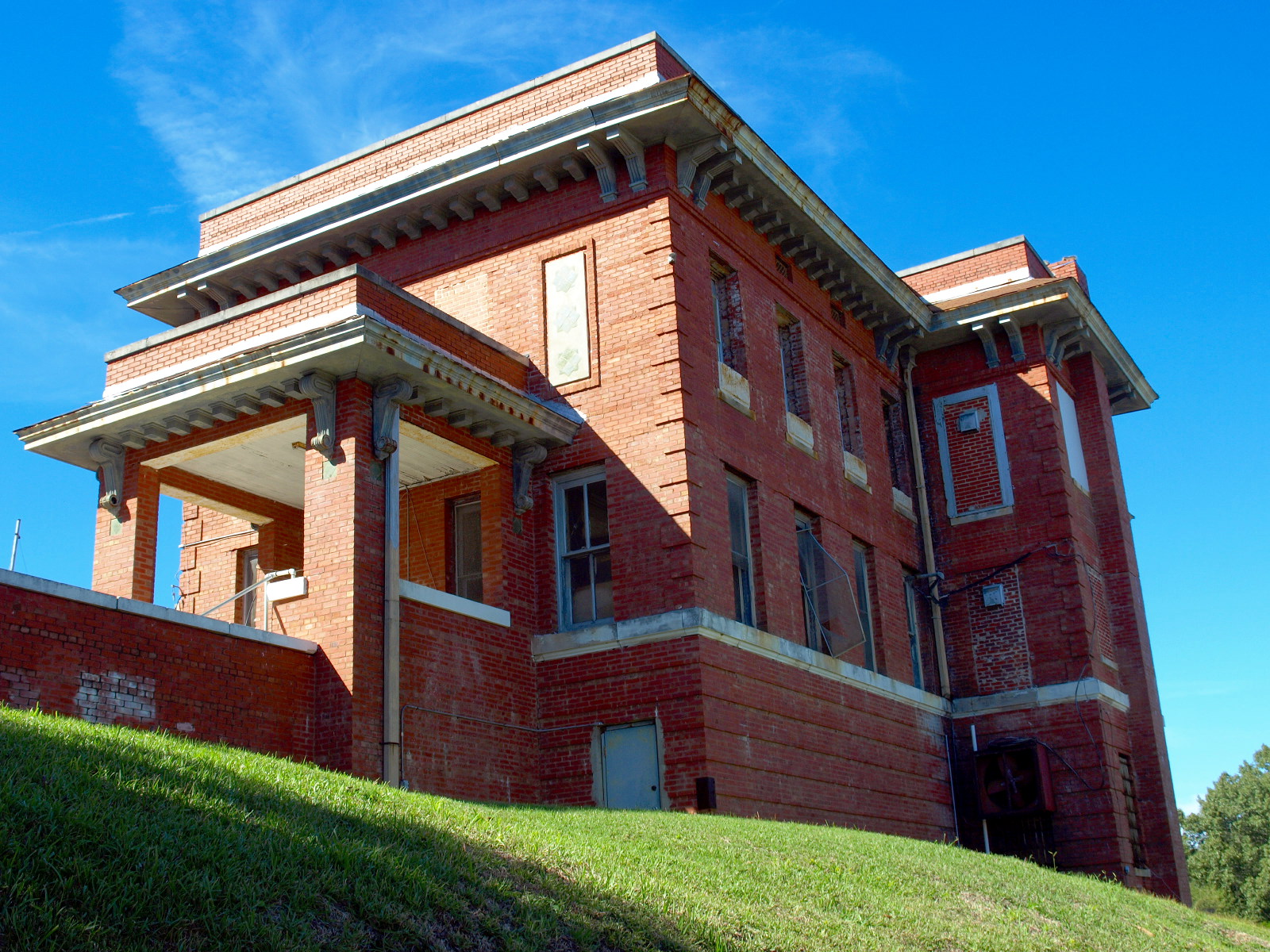
Covington County Alabama Jail

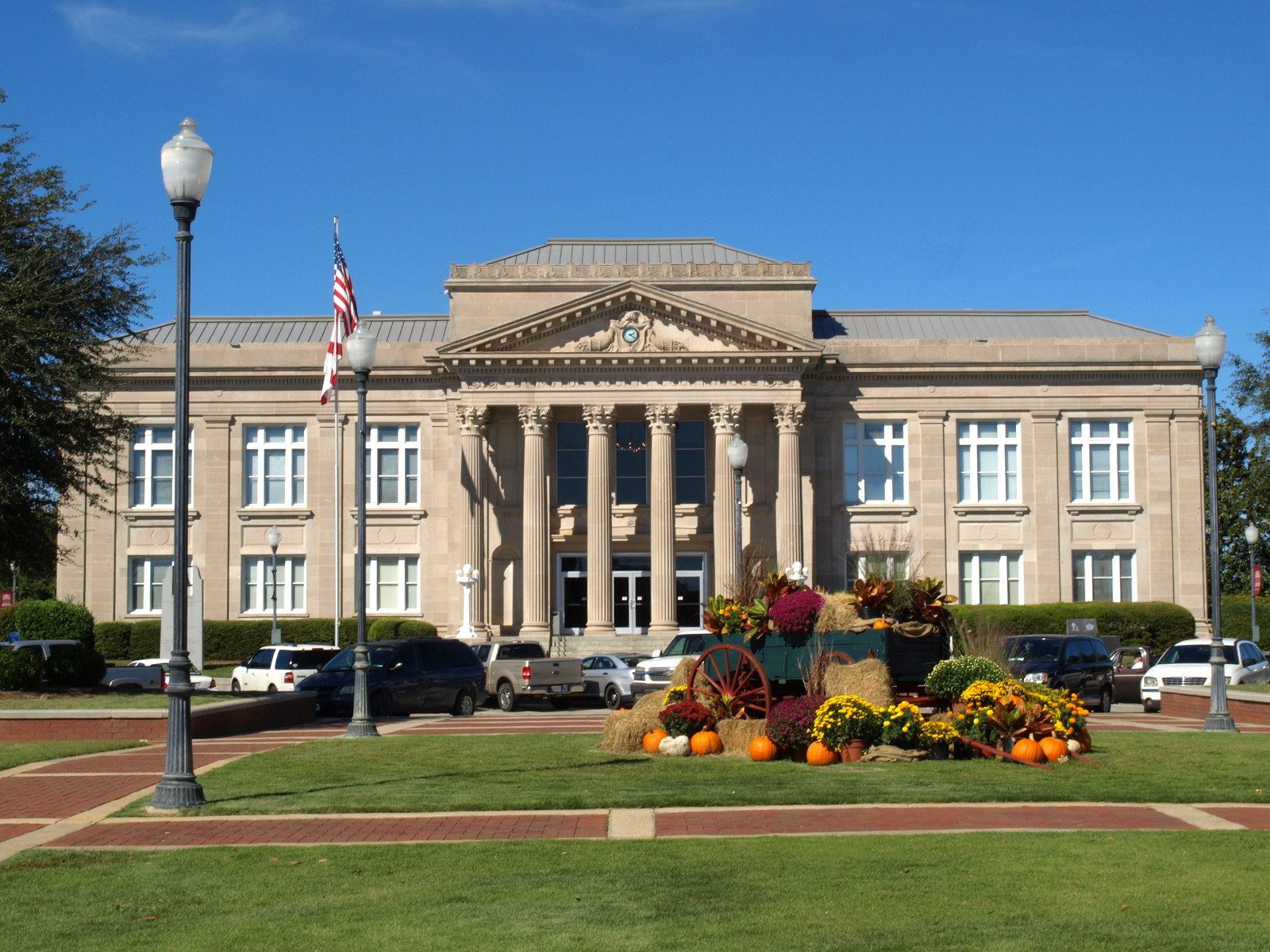
Covington County Alabama Courthouse

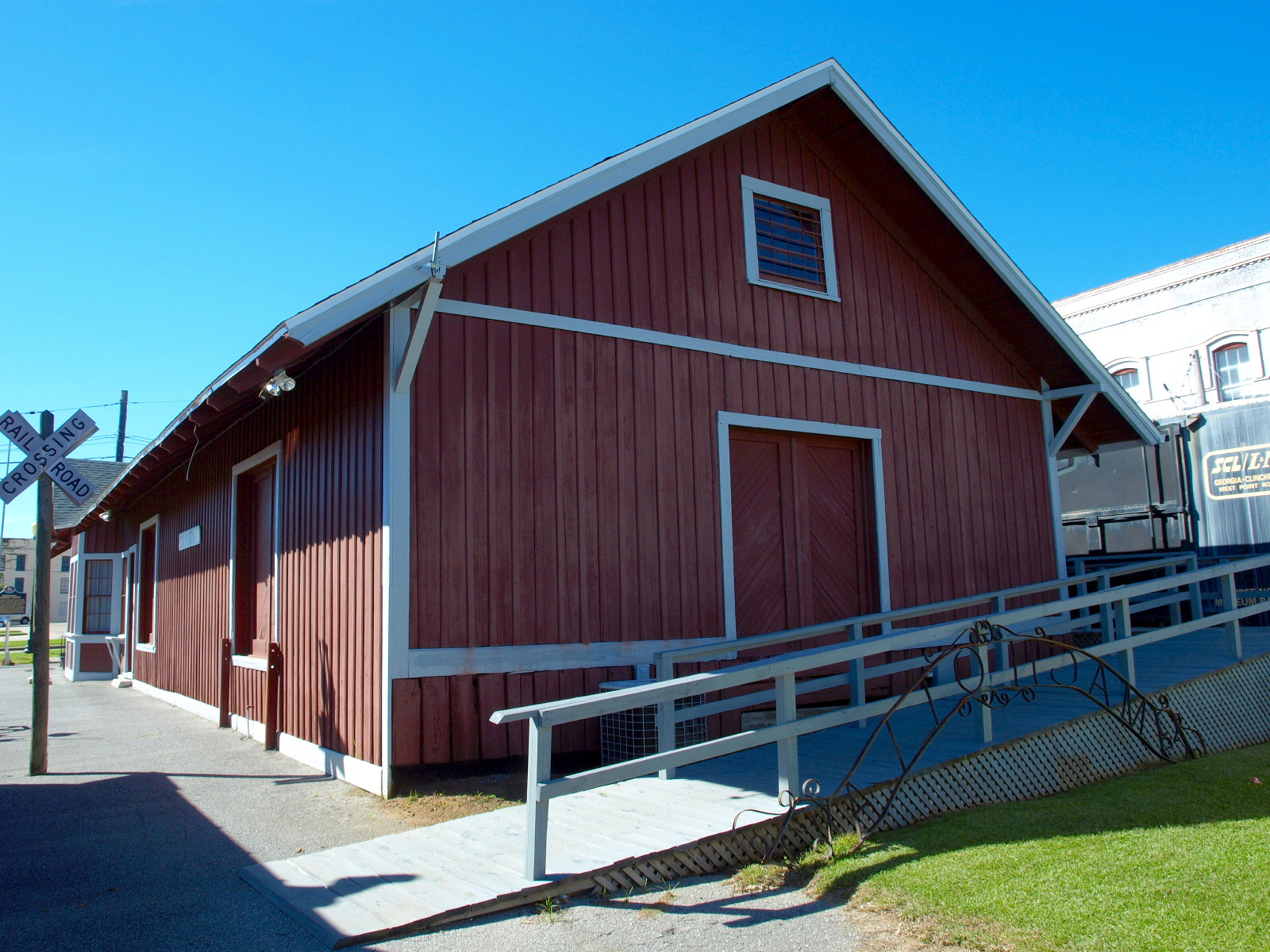
Three Notch Museum
